= Alfred Kelley =

American politician

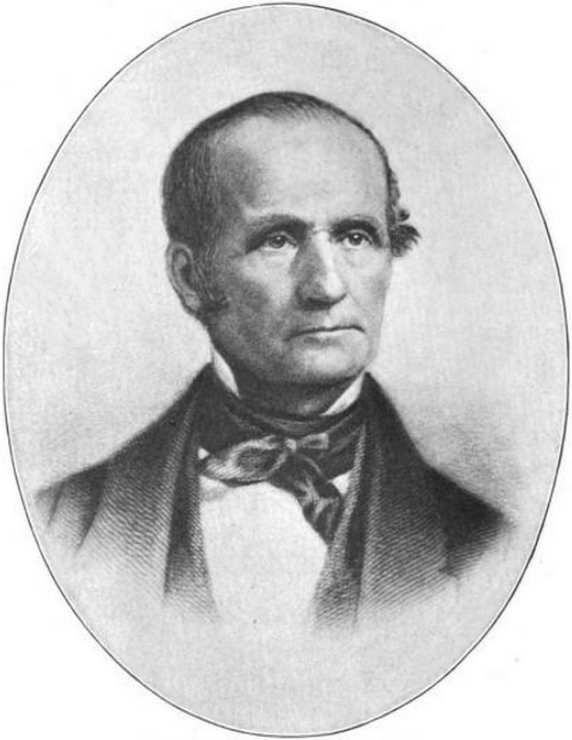
- Alfred Kelley
- Born: November 7, 1789; Charlton, Connecticut, U.S.
- Died: December 2, 1859 (aged 70); Columbus, Ohio, U.S.
- Occupations: Banker, canal builder, lawyer, legislator, railroad executive
- Known for: Building the Ohio and Erie Canal; saving Ohio from bankruptcy; establishing the State Bank of Ohio; Building the Cleveland, Columbus and Cincinnati Railroad

Alfred Kelley (November 7, 1789—December 2, 1859) was a banker, canal builder, lawyer, railroad executive, and state legislator in the state of Ohio in the United States. He is considered by historians to be one of the most prominent commercial, financial, and political Ohioans of the first half of the 19th century.

Kelley is known as the "Father of the Ohio and Erie Canal" for his successful legislative attempt to establish the Ohio and Erie Canal. He was one of the canal's first two "acting commissioners", and oversaw its construction and completion. He was the president of Columbus and Xenia Railroad (completed in 1850) and the Cleveland, Columbus and Cincinnati Railroad (completed in 1851), and pushed for a state charter for the Cleveland, Painesville and Ashtabula Railroad (later known as the Lake Shore and Michigan Southern Railroad). For this, he is known as the architect of Ohio's rail system.

As a member of the Canal Commission Fund, he helped save Ohio from bankruptcy in 1841 and 1842. As a state legislator, he led the investigation into and secured the resignation of two Ohio State Treasurers for financial malfeasance, successfully proposed legislation abolishing imprisonment for debt, created the State Bank of Ohio, reformed the state's tax system, and successfully proposed legislation to create the first state oversight of public education.

Kelley was notably the first lawyer and prosecuting attorney in Cleveland. He became the youngest member of the Ohio General Assembly at the age of 25, and returned to the legislature numerous times, until he became the oldest serving in the assembly.

== Early years ==
Joshua Stow, who encouraged his nephew Alfred Kelley to emigrate to Ohio

Alfred Kelley was born in Middlefield, Connecticut, on November 7, 1789, to Daniel and Jemima (née Stow) Kelley. He was the second of six children (all boys). The Kelleys were of English descent, having lived in Connecticut since at least 1690. The Stows were an important English land-owning family which emigrated to Massachusetts in 1630 and then Connecticut in 1650.

Alfred's uncle, Silas Stow, was the land agent for Nicholas Low, who owned the township that later became Lowville, New York. At the urging of Silas Stow, the Kelleys moved to Lowville in the winter of 1798–1799. Daniel built and operated a gristmill, and Jemima dispensed medication and medical treatment to the settlers in the area. Having attended public school in Middlefield and Lowville, Alfred enrolled at Fairfield Academy in Fairfield, New York, in 1804. Daniel Kelley was appointed a judge of the New York Court of Common Pleas in 1805, and held various other public offices in Lowville and Oneida County. (Note: Oneida County was later split into several new counties. Lowville is now in Lewis County.) The Kelleys became moderately wealthy. In 1807, Alfred began the study of law under Jonas Pratt, a judge of the New York Supreme Court.

Daniel Kelley was increasingly unhappy with the Stow family's liberal religious views, which were beginning to influence his sons. Another of Alfred's uncles, Joshua Stow, was one of the original investors in the Connecticut Land Company. By royal charter, the Connecticut Colony laid claim to most of the lands west of the colony between the 41st and 42nd parallels of north latitude. In 1786, Connecticut ceded all its land claims to the government of the United States in exchange for cancellation of its American Revolutionary War debts. Connecticut retained only those lands known as the Connecticut Western Reserve, an area bounded by Lake Erie on the north, Pennsylvania on the east, and the 41st parallel of north latitude on the south. The Western Reserve extended for exactly 120 miles (190 km) to the west, and came to an abrupt halt. (Note: Connecticut later abandoned its claim to 500,000 acres (2,000 km^{2}) of land on the western end of the Western Reserve, turning these areas over to certain coastal towns in the state as reparations for damages suffered during the Revolutionary War.) On August 3, 1795, the state of Connecticut sold the Western Reserve to the Connecticut Land Company for $1.2 million ($22,800,000 in 2025 dollars). Joshua Stow was a member of the party led by Moses Cleaveland which surveyed the Western Reserve in 1796. Encouraged by his uncle's descriptions of the lush lands of the Western Reserve, Alfred's eldest brother, Datus, traveled to the nascent settlement of Cleveland in early 1810. Although he returned almost immediately, Alfred emigrated to Cleveland in May 1810. He made the journey on horseback, accompanied by Joshua Stow and a medical student, Jared Potter Kirtland.

== Business and legal career in Cleveland ==
Alfred Kelley was admitted to the bar on November 7, 1810. He was the first lawyer to practice in Cleveland. The local court immediately appointed him prosecuting attorney for Cuyahoga County—a position he held until 1822. (Note: The rest of the Kelley family followed Alfred to Cleveland over the next few years. Daniel Kelley made the move to Cleveland in 1814. He was the village's second president (mayor) and first postmaster, and played an important in the early history of Cleveland.) In one of his most notable cases, he prosecuted a slave-hunter for kidnapping in 1820. He won the case.

In 1811, Kelley and 16 others formed the first library association in Cuyahoga County. (It lasted about four years.)

Largely through the efforts of Kelley, Cleveland was incorporated as a village by the state of Ohio on December 23, 1814. The village's first elections were held on June 5, 1815, and Kelley was elected the first president of the village unanimously. (Note: There were 12 voters.) Kelley held the position only a few months, resigning on March 19, 1816. (Note: Daniel Kelley was appointed his successor, and held the office until 1819.)

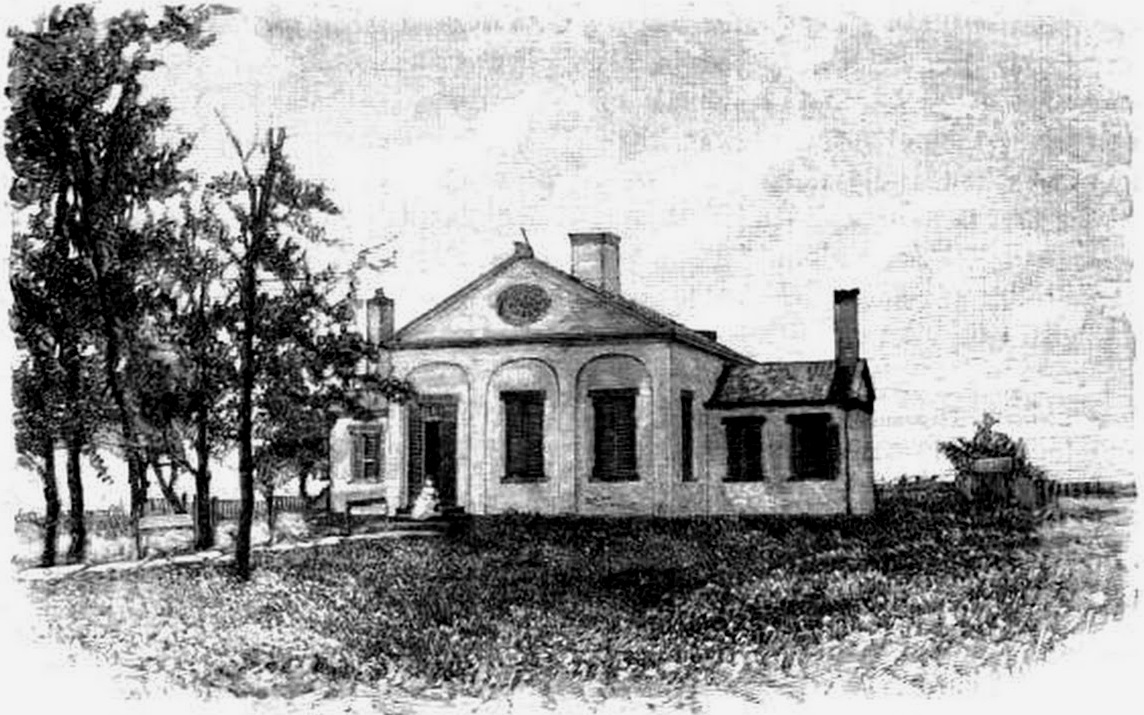
House built in Cleveland by Alfred Kelley about 1814.

Kelley bought several properties in and around Cleveland. In 1814, he purchased a parcel of land near the mouth of the Cuyahoga River. This property was defined by Water Street (now W. 9th Street) in the east, W. Lakeside Avenue on the south, the Cuyahoga River on the west, and Lake Erie on the north. Kelley constructed a home on this land in 1816. It was only the second brick house in the village of Cleveland. The structure was intended as a residence for his parents, but his mother died before it was completed. Kelley and his wife took up residence there instead, occupying the house until 1827. (Note: Jemima Kelley died in September 1815. Daniel Kelley died on August 7, 1831.) Kelley and his brothers Datus and Irad formed a general store in January 1815. They erected a brick building on Superior Avenue at the intersection with Bank Street (now W. 6th Street). (Note: This building later served as a hotel. Irad Kelley demolished it in 1850 and built a much larger structure, known as the Kelley Block, on the site. The first floor of the Kelley Block contained retail, but the second floor was a ballroom known as Kelley's Hall. Some of the most important concerts, public dances, and lectures of the mid-1800s in Cleveland took place there. The Athenaeum Theater later took over the Kelley Block, and became an important stage and later movie theater in Cleveland.) Kelley also purchased a peninsula on the west bank of the Cuyahoga River, where he established a farm. In 1833, he sold most of this land to local merchant Joel Scranton. The area thereafter became known as "Scranton Flats" or the "Scranton Peninsula".

Kelley was a major investor in and helped organize the Commercial Bank of Lake Erie (also known as the Commercial Bank of Cleveland) in August 1816. It was the first bank in Cleveland. The bank survived the Panic of 1819, but its finances were in such disarray that it was reorganized in 1820. (Note: Financier George Bancroft invested $200,000 ($4,600,000 in 2025 dollars) in the bank to aid the reorganization. This was one of Kelley's earliest links to important East Coast financiers.) Kelley was named one of 11 members of the reorganized bank's board of directors, and elected the bank's president in 1823. The bank's charter expired in 1842, its affairs wound up, and its assets distributed to its investors in 1845.

The same year that Kelley helped organize the Commercial Bank, he and 13 others formed the Cleveland Pier Company to build a pier into Lake Erie. This structure, located at the mouth of the Cuyahoga River, was erected on sand without pilings and storms soon destroyed it.

On March 2, 1817, Kelley met with eight others in Brooklyn Township to form an Episcopal congregation named Trinity Parish. Holding services in the township, Cleveland, and occasionally in the village of Euclid, it was the first Christian church formally organized in Cuyahoga County.

== Early legislative career ==
In October 1814, Alfred Kelley was elected to the Ohio House of Representatives. He was the youngest member of the state legislature, barely old enough to meet the Ohio constitution's age requirement for holding public office. He was re-elected in 1815 and 1816. (Note: Members of the Ohio House of Representatives at this time served one-year terms. The House began meeting about December 1 of the year of election. It adjourned in mid-February in 1815 and 1816, and January 28 in 1817.)

Kelley did not seek office in 1817 or 1818, but was elected again to the House in 1819. He served a single term, and did not run for reelection. His legislative accomplishments in this short period were numerous. Kelley successfully proposed that the Ohio House create a finance committee, and the members elected him its first chair. Within weeks, he authored a report which argued for taxation of land according to value and not use. No action was taken on the report; it would not be until 1846 that the state's property tax laws were changed. Kelley was also one of five members of the legislature appointed to a special committee to investigate financial malfeasance by Hiram M. Curry, the Ohio State Treasurer, and his predecessor, William McFarland, both of whom had incurred substantial deficits, embezzled funds, and exhibited incompetence. Curry resigned, the first state official to do so for corruption. Some of Kelley's legislative proposals were less successful. He introduced the first bill barring imprisonment for debt, but it did not pass. He also supported a bill to allow free African Americans to testify in court against white citizens, but this also did not win enactment.

== Involvement with the Ohio & Erie Canal ==
=== Support for a north-south canal in Ohio ===
In 1816, the state of New York asked the state of Ohio's aid in building the Erie Canal. The request was referred to the Ohio House committee on public works, which was chaired by Kelley. He wrote a report endorsing the project, but the Ohio General Assembly did not act on New York's request. Kelley and others came to believe that a canal linking the Ohio River with Lake Erie would greatly benefit Ohio. They frequently communicated with New York Governor DeWitt Clinton and those building the Erie Canal, and circulated glowing reports about construction progress and the ease with which financing was obtained. They also worked to build a coalition strong enough to overcome parochial opposition to an Ohio canal.

In one of his first acts as Governor of Ohio, in December 1818 Ethan Allen Brown proposed construction of a canal between the Ohio River and Lake Erie. A financial panic occurred between March and August 1818 that led to a severe national recession (known as the Panic of 1819) that militated against any consideration of a major spending bill like the canal. The recession finally eased in the spring of 1821.

=== Role on the investigating commission ===
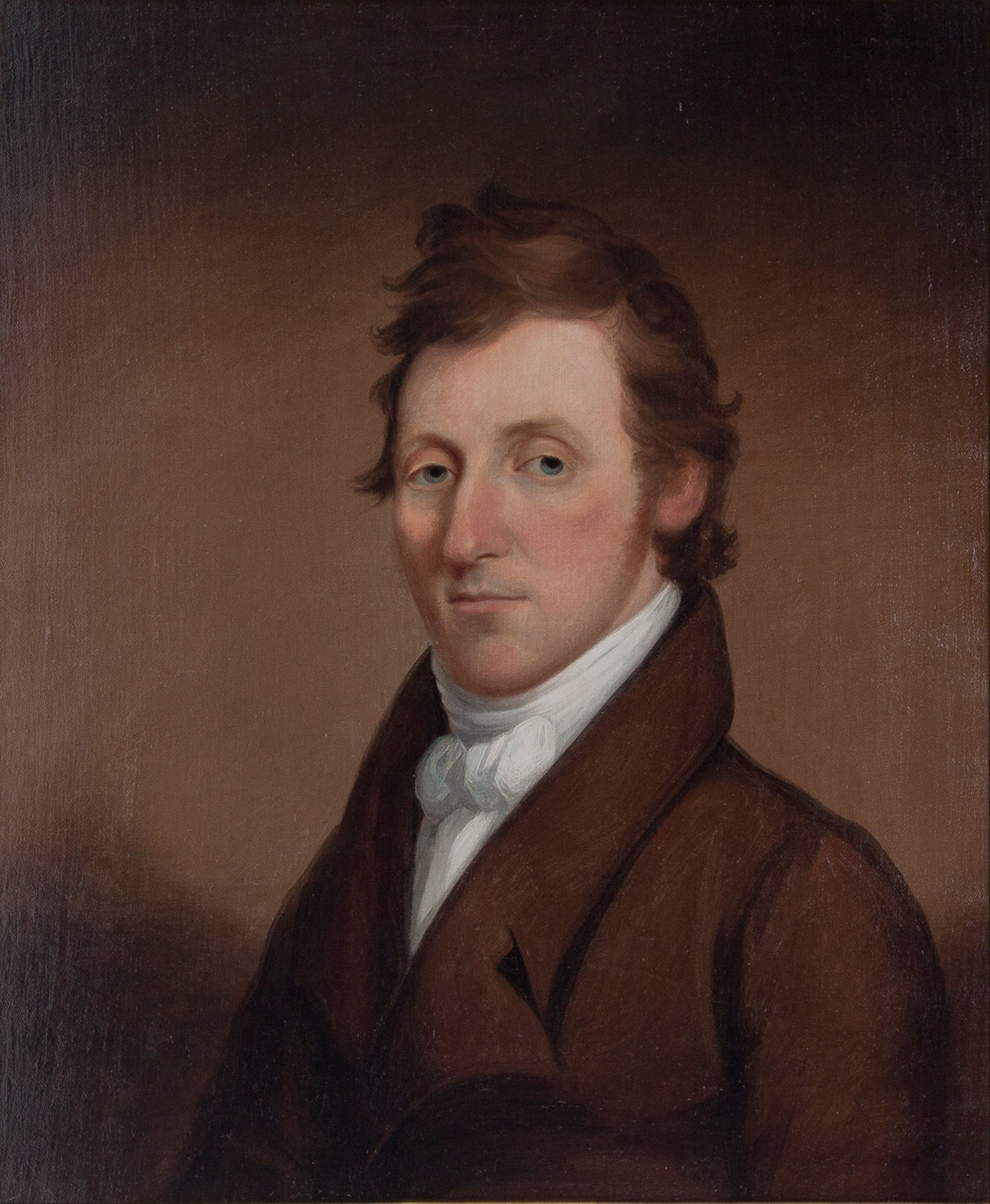
Micajah Williams

Kelley was elected to the Ohio Senate in 1821 and again in 1822. On January 31, 1822, the Ohio General Assembly passed legislation authorizing the appointment of a commission to investigate the feasibility of building the canal proposed by Governor Brown. Five different routes were described in the authorization bill, and the commission was charged with assessing each of them. The seven individuals appointed to the commission were Ethan Allen Brown, newly sworn in on January 3 as a U.S. Senator; Ebenezer Buckingham Jr., who had surveyed much of central Ohio; former Madison County judge Isaac Miner; former U.S. Senator Jeremiah Morrow; former Ohio State Senator and prominent Steubenville attorney Benjamin Tappan; former governor and U.S. Senator Thomas Worthington; and Alfred Kelley. Morrow resigned after being elected governor of Ohio in the fall of 1822, and was replaced by Micajah Williams, a Cincinnati banker, on January 27, 1823.

Kelley drafted the report of the investigatory commission. He grasped the need for a statewide (not regional or local) transportation network, and realized that only the state government could be the catalyst for making this improvement. His expansive vision for the state was moderated by a strong commitment to careful planning and strong cost–benefit analysis.

Kelley and Williams did most of the work of the investigating commission. They examined and surveyed routes, (Note: Kelley even accompanied engineer James Geddes in 1822 as he made the initial surveys of the five proposed canal routes.) collected data, wrote economic studies, and analyzed construction techniques to determine the best means of building the canal. Kelley traveled to New York to see the kind of construction technology used there, consulted with Erie Canal construction supervisors and state officials, and procured as much information as he could on how the canal was financed. Kelley purchased engineering and surveying instruments from firms on the East Coast, identified engineers available to work on the canal, and obtained a $1,400 ($37,625 in 2025 dollars) appropriation for the State Library of Ohio so it could purchase books on canal engineering and construction. This work gave Kelley critical insight into the importance of design and the mastery of detail.

The investigating commission issued its report on January 21, 1824. The report recommended that the northern terminus be near the mouth of the Cuyahoga River. The canal route followed the Cuyahoga from Cleveland to Akron, the Tuscarawas River from Akron through Dover to Coshocton, the Muskingum River from Coshocton to Zanesville, and the Licking River from Zanesville to Newark. The proposed route then proceeded overland from Newark south to Licking Summit Reservoir (now Buckeye Lake) and then overland again to Baltimore and Carroll before turning northwest toward Canal Winchester. Thereafter, the report recommended that the canal generally follow Big Walnut Creek to Columbus, and then the Scioto River south from Columbus through Chillicothe to Portsmouth on the Ohio River. The investigating commission also recommended simultaneous construction of the Miami and Erie Canal from Cincinnati at least as far as Dayton.

Opponents of the canal accused Kelley and other investigating commissioners of recommending a route along which they already owned land, enriching themselves. These accusations appear unfounded. The commission had surveyed the other routes and extensively documented their unfeasibility, and historian Harry N. Schreiber has observed that there is no evidence in the commission's papers or Kelley's private correspondence to suggest any impropriety. Nor did the report actually designate Cleveland as the northern terminus. Instead, it required the canal to be built along the route with the most water. (Note: There was significant opposition to the canal from other Lake Erie cities, particularly Sandusky. Declining to specify a northern terminus may have been a political decision calculated to defuse some of this tension, even though Cleveland was clearly the intended northern terminus.)

To placate its critics, the investigating commission had the route between Sandusky and Columbus resurveyed by a new engineer. Once more, the investigating committee rejected this route as lacking enough water to sustain the canal. The investigating commission issued its updated report on January 8, 1825.

=== Canal commissioner ===
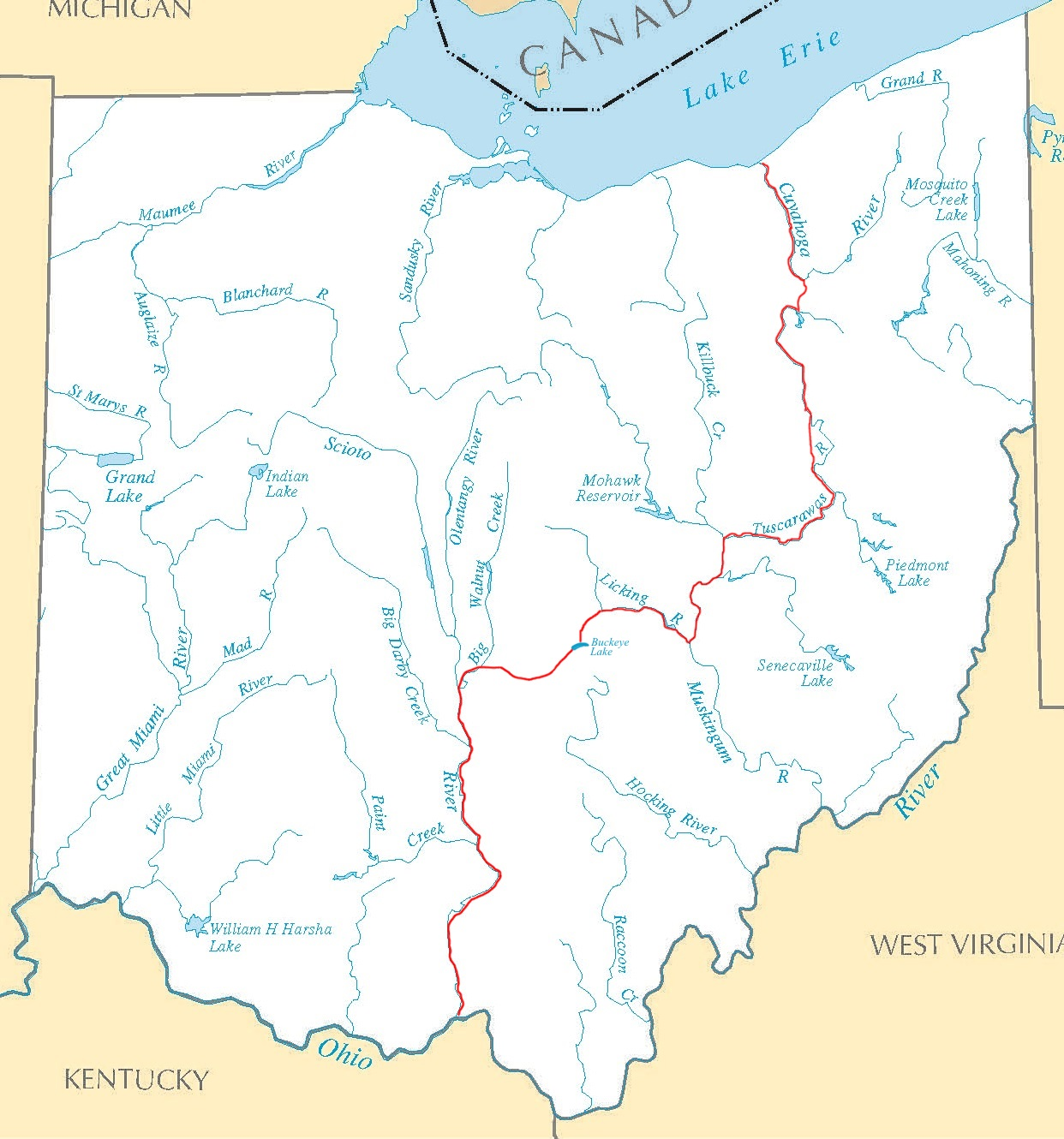
Map of the Ohio and Erie Canal (in red)

The Ohio General Assembly approved legislation on February 4, 1825, authorizing construction of the Ohio & Erie Canal. The same day, the legislature adopted a bill to reconstitute the investigating commission as the Canal Commission, with authority to oversee financing and construction of the canal. Canal Commission members included Kelley; newcomer Nathaniel Beasley, a former surveyor and soldier who had served several terms in both chambers of the General Assembly; newcomer John Johnston, a former Indian agent with extensive landholdings in Miami County; Miner; Tappan; Williams; and Worthington. (Note: Brown and Buckingham declined to serve, hence the new commission membership.) The Canal Commission picked two of their members, Kelley and Williams, to be "acting commissioners", individuals with direct supervision over canal construction. The two men located the actual canal route, negotiated for and purchased land, wrote engineering specifications for the canal bed and locks, advertised for and awarded contracts, purchased supplies, and supervised the engineers and surveyors in the employ of the state who worked on the canal. (Note: Kelley had a very hands-on management style. He personally handled contractor complaints and mediated disputes on his engineering staff. He also performed tasks contractors might be expected to carry out, such as locating sources of lime or potential quarries along the route and acting as a quality inspector.) The raising of funds through the issuance of bonds and stock was the legal responsibility of a separate Canal Fund Commission, but in practice the Canal Fund Commission delegated most of its power to Kelley and Williams.

Kelley and Williams accomplished two major tasks in 1825. The first was to purchase or obtain a right of way to the land needed for the canal. The Canal Commission did not formally select the northern route of the canal until May 1825, and until that happened Kelley and Williams had to solicit land along both the Black and Cuyahoga rivers. They were highly successful, and managed to have significant amount of land donated (rather than sold). (Note: Many donations came from real estate developers who wanted to steer the canal toward their lands so they could later reap huge profits.) Kelley himself donated about a third of his remaining Scranton Flats land for the project. Kelley and Williams also established a large, professional bureaucracy to construct and finance the canal. In the United States in the early 1800s, state governments employed only a few dozen people. Kelley and Williams made recommendations to the full commission regarding organizational structure, staffing, and the duties of each job. The commission invariably followed their guidance, and in so doing allowed Kelley and Williams to create the first large bureaucracy in Ohio history.

Work on the Ohio & Erie Canal commenced on December 10, 1825. Ohio was underdeveloped and starved for capital, and there was not nearly enough private money in the state to make even a small domestic bond sale successful. Kelley and Williams had to spend money judiciously. Rather than market all or a large portion of the necessary bonds immediately, the Canal Fund Commission decided to float only $400,000 ($11,700,000 in 2025 dollars) worth of bonds. These bonds were offered at a high rate of interest to attract buyers. The hope was that, as segments of the canal became operational and substantial toll income was generated, the bonds would become more attractive and the interest rate on future offerings would necessarily fall. (Note: Three other factors also helped make the bond sale successful. First, Erie Canal bonds were selling very well, which helped assuage investor nervousness about the riskiness of the Ohio canal bonds. Second, investors knew that traffic on the Erie Canal would increase significantly once goods began moving on the Ohio & Erie Canal. Thus, building the Ohio & Erie Canal was a way of improving the value of their existing investment in the New York state canal. Third, the state of Ohio had pledged to use its tax revenues to guarantee payment of bond interest and principal.) Work on the Cleveland-to-Akron segment began first. (Note: Completing segments that connected to market outlets (like Cleveland) was the highest priority. These segments would generate significant toll revenue. If future bond sales failed, canal tolls on these segments could keep construction going.) Kelley fought against constant pressure from politicians and the press to spread finances and workforce thin and work on all segments of the canal at the same time. The "acting commissioners" also had to overcome unexpected labor shortages and contractors who abandoned their work.

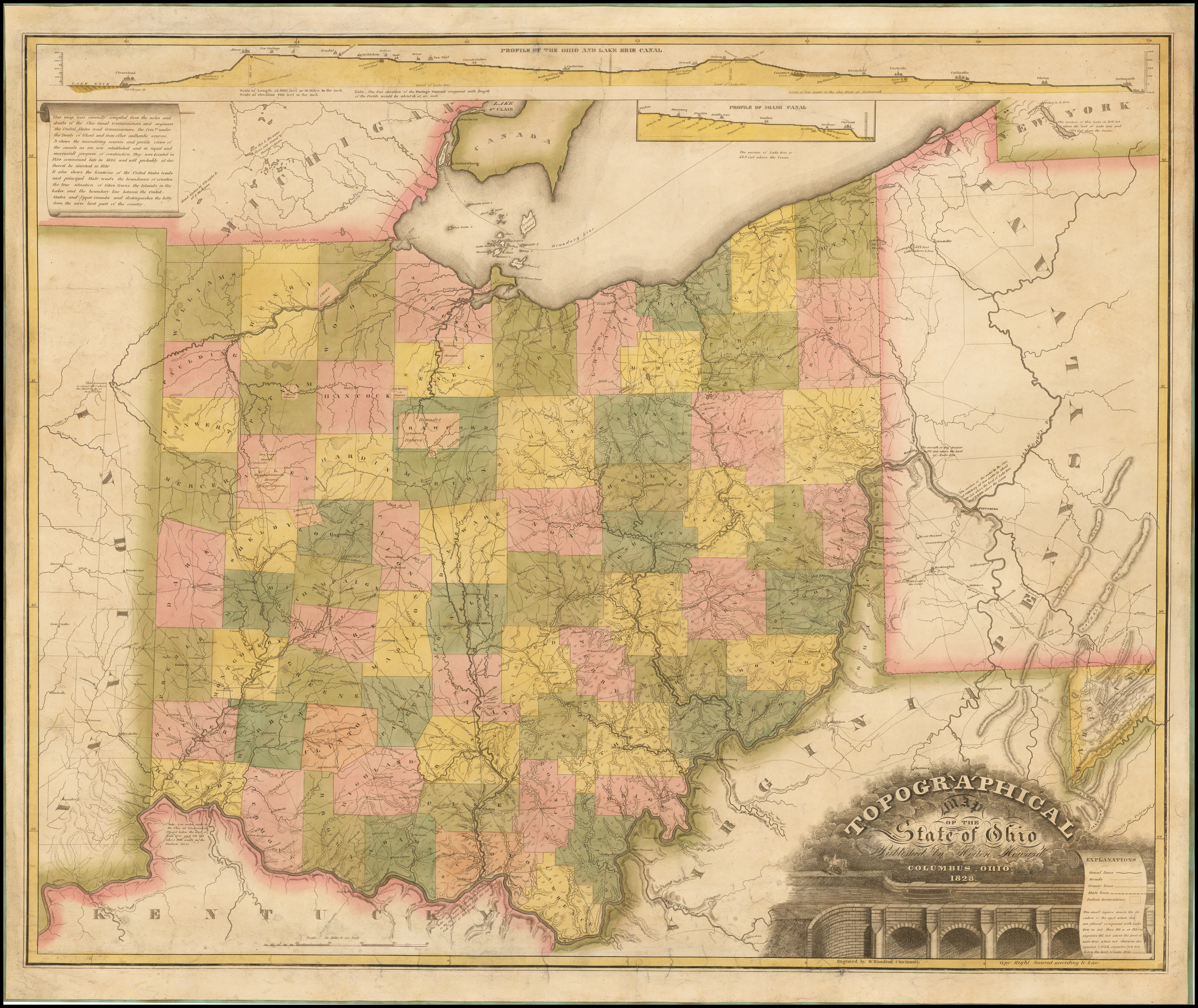
Kelley's topographical map of Ohio

Through his hands-on work on the canal, Kelley became so well acquainted with the geography of Ohio that he authored the first comprehensive topographical map of the state in 1826. The other canal commissioners agreed to allow it to be published. Kelley tried to have the map published by a printer in the state of Delaware, but was embarrassed to discover that the Ohio General Assembly claimed copyright of his document.

The Cleveland-to-Akron portion of the canal opened in July 1827, ahead of schedule. The high quality work, lack of corruption, and budget-conscious construction impressed investors, making it easier to sell canal bonds in the future. The responsibility for setting toll rates on the new canal also fell to Kelley and Williams. Impressed with the efficiency and speed of Ohio canal construction, the federal government agreed donate public land to the state with the stipulation that this land be sold to aid canal construction. Almost 421,400 acres (1,705 km^{2}) were donated along the route of the Miami Extension Canal, (Note: This canal extended from Dayton to the Wabash and Erie Canal at Junction, Ohio.) almost 292,700 acres (1,185 km^{2}) along the Wabash and Erie Canal, and another 500,000 acres (2,000 km^{2}) throughout the state for other canals.

In 1832, the Ohio & Erie Canal was finished, except for the final lock at Portsmouth. Work on the Miami and Erie Canal was also complete, except for the lock connecting the Great Miami and Ohio Rivers at Cincinnati. Kelley contracted malaria in his first years of work on the canal, and in 1832 his health was so poor that canal commission meetings had to be held at his home. In their 1832 annual report to the state legislature, Kelley and Williams proposed that the Canal Commission be abolished and a new commission, consisting entirely of politically neutral engineers, be established to oversee future construction and operation. This was one of only a handful of recommendations the two made which the General Assembly refused to adopt.

With work on both canals completed in 1833, and in poor health, Kelley resigned from the Canal Commission on January 24, 1834 (effective March 1). For his role in authorizing and construction the Ohio and Erie Canal, the press and civic leaders in Ohio lauded him as the "father of the Ohio and Erie Canal".

== Return to the state legislature ==
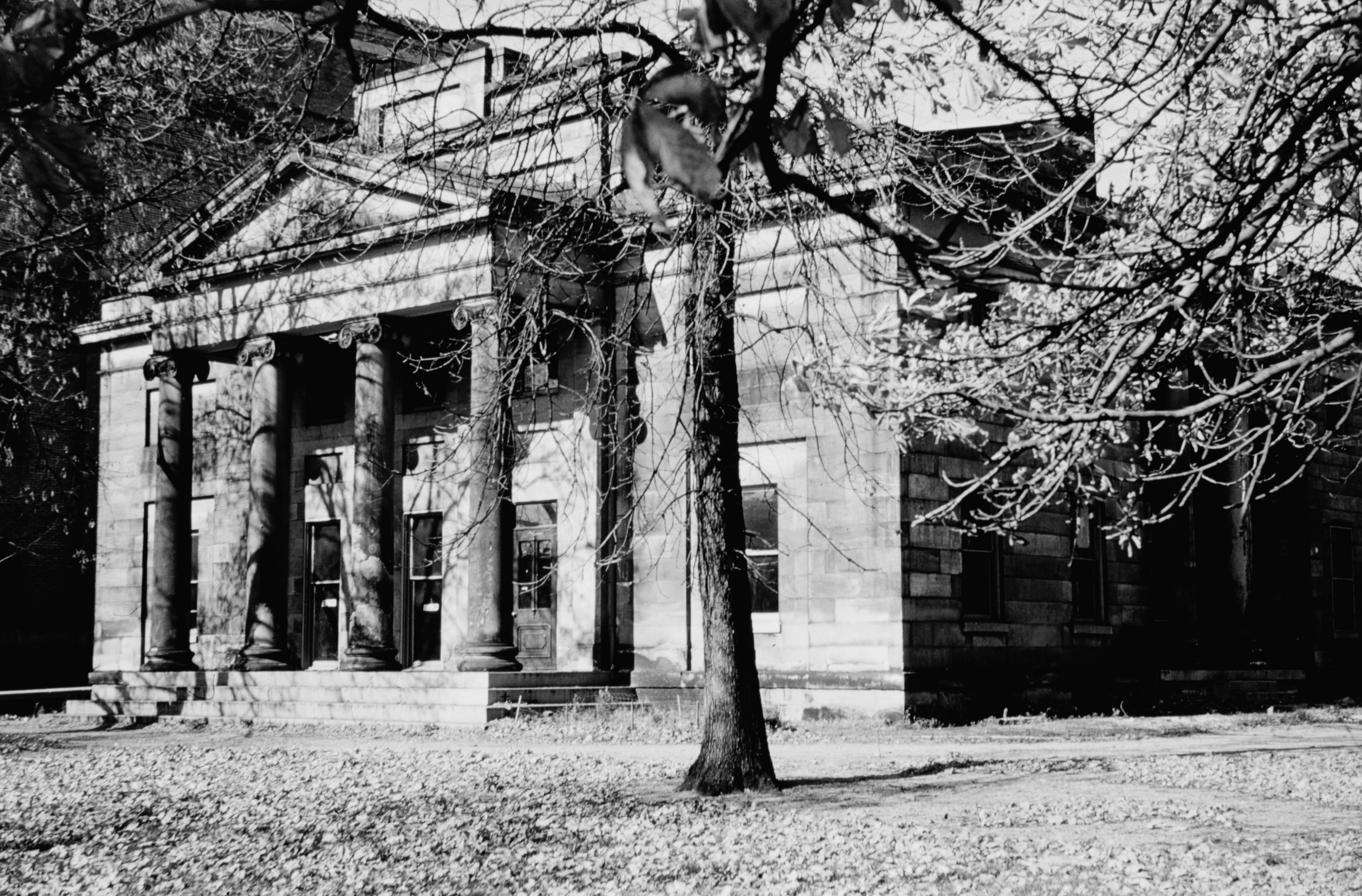
The Alfred Kelley mansion in 1958, a few years before it was demolished.

In October 1830, Alfred Kelley relocated from Cleveland to Columbus after his wife, Mary, pleaded with him to move the family so they could spend more time together. Kelley, one of the wealthiest men in Columbus, purchased 18 acres (73,000 m^{2}) of land on E. Broad Street. Beginning in 1837, he began construction on a large Greek Revival home at 282 East Broad Street, known as the Alfred Kelley mansion.

Kelley also made large real estate purchases in Franklin County and in Cleveland after leaving the Canal Commission. Kelley, Moylen Northrup, and John Kerr purchased a large parcel in what became downtown Columbus. This land was platted and subdivided in 1838 and incorporated into the city of Columbus, making Kelley a substantial profit.

=== Becoming a Whig ===
In the early 1830s, Kelley left the Democratic-Republican Party and joined the Whig Party. This switch in political affiliations began in the mid-1810s when Kelley became a supporter of Henry Clay, the Democratic-Republican Speaker of the United States House of Representatives. Clay had proposed the "American System", an economic program consisting of high tariffs, strong banking regulation, and federal subsidies for infrastructure improvements like roads and canals. The Democratic-Republican Party was deeply divided over these proposals, however. One faction, led by Andrew Jackson, harbored a deep suspicion of the federal government. These "Jacksonians" viewed strong government as a threat to individual freedom, favored the farmer over the businessman, and believed that government programs (such as banking reform and regulation, infrastructure development, public education, and high tariffs) benefited the rich at the expense of the common man. The other faction, led by Clay and John Quincy Adams, favored high tariffs, believing they would prevent specie from going overseas and thus allow banks to expand capital and credit. Coupled with a strong and activist central government and system of federally-financed infrastructure improvement, these "National Republicans" hoped to expand the economy, empower producers (businessmen and farmers), and bring new and improved products to markets (consumers).

Clay ran against Jackson for the presidency in 1824, but John Quincy Adams won the nation's highest office after the election was thrown into the House for resolution. The Democratic-Republican Party collapsed, with Jackson forming a new Democratic Party in 1828. Rejecting the label "National Republican" as too closely tied to northeastern business interests, Clay formed the Whig Party in 1834. Neither the national Democratic Party (which dismissed state intervention in the economy and a stronger banking system) nor the Ohio Democratic Party (which rejected prioritization of canal construction projects, distrusted the opinions of professionals and experts, and wished to retain a politicized canal board) held any interest for Kelley.

Kelley was elected chairman of the Whig State Central Committee of Ohio in 1840. His prominence in the party made him a frequent target of political invective.

=== Return to the Ohio House ===
Kelley sought and won election to the Ohio House again in 1836. Columbus and Franklin County were Democratic strongholds, however, and Democratic-controlled newspapers accused Kelley of making immorally high profits from his banking business, speculating on real estate, and enriching himself by ensuring that the Ohio & Erie Canal passed near his land. As evidence of his wealth, the newspapers pointed to the "palace" Kelley was building in Columbus. These attacks were largely ignored by voters, who elected Kelley by a wide margin even though he was now a Whig. During the 1836-1837 legislative term, Kelley sponsored a resolution instructing the House Committee on Schools and School Lands to report a bill authorizing appointment of a state school commissioner. The resolution passed and the reported bill became law, creating the modern Ohio public school system.

Kelley sought and won re-election to the Ohio House in 1837. The previous session, the Ohio General Assembly had enacted legislation (known colloquially as the "Loan Law") which required the state to match, on a dollar-for-dollar basis, any private investment in canals, railroads, or turnpikes so long as these ventures met certain requirements. The state was rapidly issuing bonds to comply with the law, despite the ill-considered or parochial nature of these projects. Kelley's bill to repeal the Loan Law failed. He was successful on another front, when his 17-year legislative effort to abolish imprisonment for debt finally won the approval of the legislature.

== Bank investor and executive ==
=== Using the canal fund to build banking relationships ===
Kelley built extensive business and personal relationships with bankers in Ohio and New York City while a Canal Commissioner. To help Ohio banks, Kelley required that canal workers be paid in bank scrip. This ensured that bank scrip circulated more widely, helping to expand a bank's market and making each bank's scrip more widely accepted by the public. (Note: Before the adoption of the United States Constitution in 1790, the federal government had no power to levy taxes or coin money. It authorized banks to issue "scrip", a promise by the government to pay. Scrip became, essentially, paper currency. Congress defined the United States dollar as the standard money unit in 1792, but banks continued to issue scrip both as "bills of credit" guaranteed by the federal government and as representative of specie deposits made by customers. Scrip was not universally accepted, however. Scrip that was easily counterfeited or issued by a bank without an extremely strong reputation for honoring scrip was often not accepted. It was not until 1866 that a federal tax essentially put an end to the practice of bank-issued scrip.)

=== Banking roles ===
Kelley's close association with the banks made him a leading figure in the Ohio banking community by the mid-1830s. In April 1832, Kelley and eight others sought additional investment to help expand the Commercial Bank of Lake Erie. Most of the capital was provided by Henry W. Dwight and his wealthy family of bankers and investors. (Note: The Dwights lived primarily in Geneva, New York, and Springfield, Massachusetts.) The Commercial Bank of Lake Erie was Cleveland's only bank from 1832 to 1834, and afterward only one of two. Until the expiration of its charter in 1843, it provided most of the scrip and bills of credit in northern Ohio, provided the underpinning for nearly all of Cleveland's business community, and was one of only a few major banks where the state and federal government deposited specie. Kelley pushed the bank to become involved with the Ohio & Erie Canal. It received specie payments from Eastern bond investors and disbursed scrip and specie on behalf of the Canal Fund Commission. Kelley also became a major investor in the Franklin Bank of Columbus (probably no later than June 1836). This institution, founded in 1816, became a depository for canal funds and disbursed specie and scrip on behalf of the Canal Commission, and Kelley was later elected to the bank's board of directors. Through Micajah Williams, Kelley also became a stockholder in the Franklin Bank of Cincinnati.

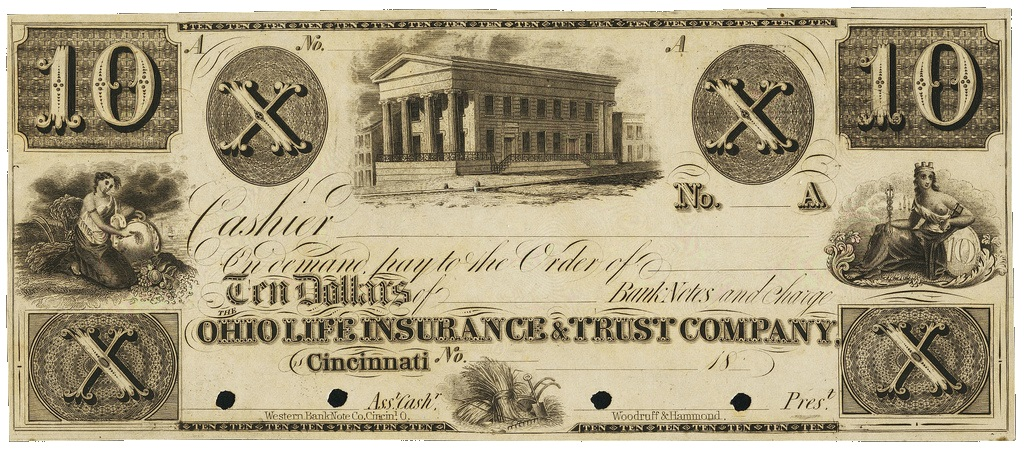
Ohio Life Insurance and Trust Co. banknote from 1839 or 1840

Kelley's biggest role as a banker was his participation as an organizer and trustee of the Ohio Life Insurance and Trust Company. The Trust Co., as it was more commonly known, was conceived by Connecticut and New York financier Isaac Bronson, his son Arthur Bronson, and New York lawyer and prominent Jacksonian Charles Butler (brother of U.S. Attorney General Benjamin Franklin Butler). They had previously incorporated the New York Life Insurance and Trust Company, which gave wealthy Easterners the chance to invest in a bank whose sole business was to make real estate mortgages in western New York. It made large profits. They now conceived of a similar organization for Ohio, and gathered a secretive group of initial investors ("the associates"). (Note: The associates included Benjamin Franklin Butler, Lot Clark, Jonathan Goodhue, Gould Hoyt, James G. King, James Boyles Murray, John Ward (brother of financier Samuel Ward III), and Stephen Whitney.) At this period in American history, nearly all states refused to allow "foreign" (out-of-state) corporations to do business within their borders. The associates recruited Elisha Whittlesey (Note: Whittlesey had been elected to the Ohio General Assembly in 1820, and to the U.S. House of Representatives in 1823. He was a prominent Whig, banker, and land speculator, and was still serving in the House in 1834. On the advice of Kelley, Whittlesey had, some years earlier, bought extensive land in Toledo, Ohio, which later was chosen as the northern terminus of the Wabash and Erie Canal.) and Micajah T. Williams to be "front men" for them, so that the project would appear to be conceived by and for the benefit of Ohioans. The Bronsons and a few of the other associates wrote the Trust Co. charter. Although Democrats attacked the Trust Co. as a "moneyed monster", a majority of Ohio state legislators were deeply concerned that a capital liquidity crisis was about to emerge in Ohio. (Note: President Andrew Jackson had vetoed a bill renewing the charter of the Second Bank of the United States, and federal officials shut down the bank's branches in Ohio in October 1833—leaving the state with much less capital and specie. The General Assembly could have chartered a state bank to take the place of the Second Bank, but declined to do so.) To alleviate the problem, on February 12, 1834, the Ohio General Assembly chartered 10 new private banks with total a capitalization of $4.4 million ($141,900,000 in 2025 dollars). Among them was the Trust Co., which accounted for $2 million ($6,500,000 in 2025 dollars) of that capital.

Although Trust Co. stock was supposed to be sold to the public, the associates ensured that all the stock was sold in advance to their most trusted friends and business partners. Fully 75 percent of the stock was owned by wealthy New Englanders and large New York City investment companies. (Note: These included Henry James Anderson, Walter Bowne, Isaac Carrow, George Griswold, Peter Harmony, Pierre Lorillard II, Thomas B. Olcott, and Enos T. Throop, and companies such as John Ward and Company; Nevins, Townsend and Company; and Prime, Ward & King.) The remaining stock was sold to prominent Ohioans such as Jacob Burnet, David T. Disney, John H. Groesbeck, Simon Perkins, Elisha Whittlesey, Micajah Williams, and Alfred Kelley. The Bronsons, who secured a large majority of shares via proxy from the eastern shareholders, hand-picked the board of directors, who were elected on September 30, 1834. The charter required that at least two-thirds of the board be Ohioans, which required great care on the part of the Bronsons to ensure that the board did not include risk-takers or self-dealers. Among the Ohioans on the board were Jacob Burnet, David T. Disney, Calvin Pease, Simon Perkins, Benjamin Tappan, Allen Trimble, Joseph Vance, Elisha Whittlesey, Micajah Williams, and Alfred Kelley.

=== Dilemma of 1839 ===
The Trust Co. was highly respected at the outset. As expected, it served as a depository institution for the state of Ohio, receiving and disbursing scrip and specie. It also did a large amount of business with private banks in addition to its real estate mortgage business.

The Panic of 1837 significantly damaged the financial standing of the Trust Co. In October 1839, the company stopped making payment in specie. This placed its charter at risk, for state law allowed the company to suspend payment of specie only for 30 days. As a director of the bank, Kelley faced a dilemma: The Trust Co. held more than $1 million ($30,200,000 in 2025 dollars) in canal and state bonds. The only way the company could survive was if it sold these bonds. However, this risked driving down the price of the bonds the Canal Fund Commission was trying to sell at the same time and could imperil work on the many Ohio & Erie branch canals under construction as well as other state-backed canals. (Note: Bonds are sold with a par, or face, value and an interest rate. Bond sellers can sell the bond for below par, effectively raising the yield of the bond. Selling the bond below par, however, means the bond seller does not raise as much money as expected. In the worst-case scenario, the Canal Fund Commission would not only sell bonds below par but also fail to sell all the bonds it needed (as investors—worried by the drop in face value—lost faith in the bonds and stopped purchasing them).)

Kelley decided to risk further work on the canal system and advocated saving the bank by placing the bonds on the market. He believed that the Trust Co. was "too big to fail"; there was no way state legislature would retaliate by rescinding the bank's charter because this would cause too much damage to Ohio's economy. Disaster was averted when the bond market, recovering from the Panic of 1837, absorbed the sale of bonds sold by the Trust Co. and the Canal Fund.

== Canal Fund Commission and the Panic of 1837 ==
Kelley returned to state employment when he was appointed a Canal Fund Commissioner on March 30, 1841. He did not relinquish his seat on the Trust Co. board of directors.

Kelley became a commissioner as the Canal Fund and Ohio state finances were in crisis.

=== Causes of the Canal Fund crisis ===
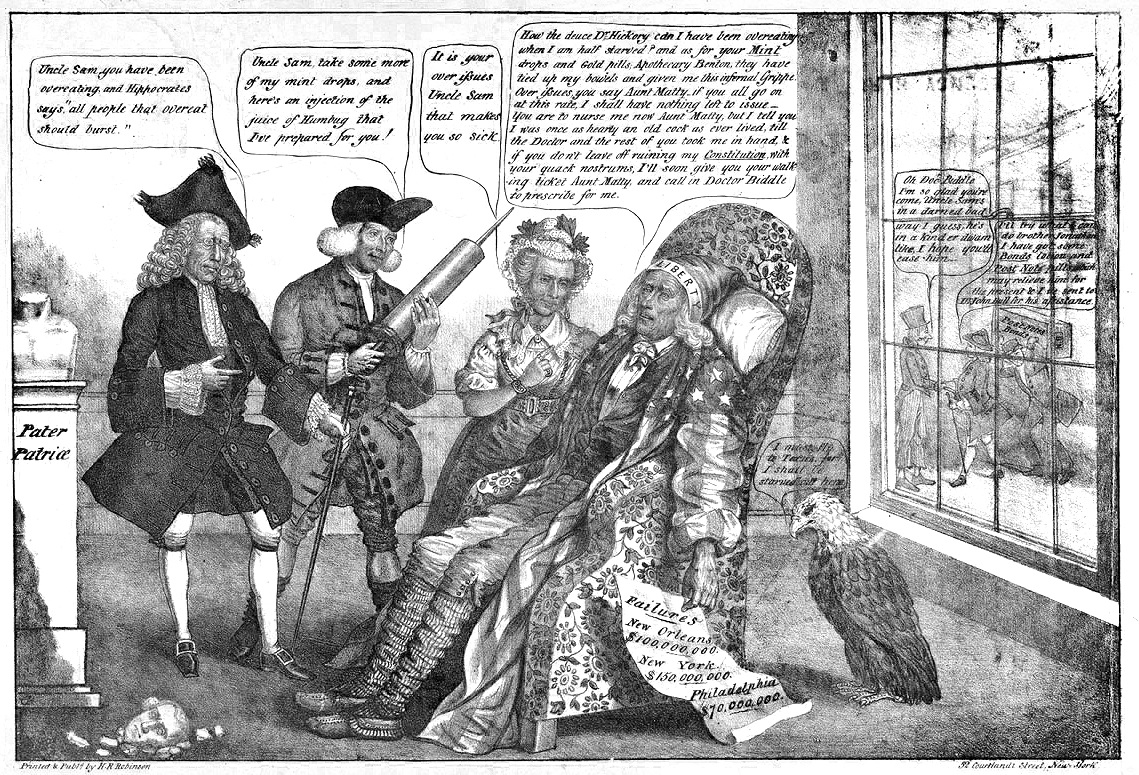
A political cartoon caricatures Andrew Jackson and others for starving the American economy of cash, causing the Panic of 1837

One distal cause of the financial crisis was the extensive amount of canal construction the state had embarked on beginning in 1833. The General Assembly authorized construction of the Miami Canal Extension (from Dayton to Lake Erie) in 1833, construction of the Wabash and Erie Canal in 1834, and more than 15 feeder and branch canals and sidecuts. (Note: These included the Hocking Canal, Walhonding Canal, Warren County Canal, and the Muskingum Improvement.) (Note: A feeder canal is a canal primarily used to convey water into the main canal, although it may also carry boat traffic. A branch canal is a canal, of short to medium length, designed to penetrate a geographic or market area adjacent to the main canal and bring traffic in agricultural products, raw materials, or finished goods to the main canal. A sidecut is a short canal similar to a branch canal, but intended to link a specific village, town, or city to the main canal.) Unlike the prioritized building program adopted by Kelley and Williams, the state pursued all these construction projects simultaneously. This greatly increased the Canal Fund Commission's need to raise money. Moreover, while the cost of these projects was originally estimated at $4.5 million ($150,100,000 in 2025 dollars), actual costs were much closer to $10 million ($284,600,000 in 2025 dollars).

Another distal cause of the crisis was the Loan Law of 1837. By 1839, state debt had soared to $12 million ($362,800,000 in 2025 dollars), of which $2.5 million was Loan Law debt and $8.5 million was attributable to work on the six new feeder and branch canals. The debt reached $14.8 million ($477,300,000 in 2025 dollars) in 1840, and another $2.5 million was needed to complete the work. The debt reached $17 million ($530,600,000 in 2025 dollars) in 1841.

The proximate cause of the financial crisis was the Panic of 1837. The Canal Fund had great difficulty selling bonds in 1837, and had so little money on hand that (except for those working on the Wabash & Erie Canal) it stopped paying contractors in December 1837. Additionally, canal revenues were not high enough to pay the interest on canal construction debt. In order to make interest payments in early 1838, the Canal Fund floated even more bonds and sought loans from banks. (Note: Beginning in 1838 and ending in 1844, more than $900,000 ($31,100,000 in 2025 dollars) in new borrowing (bonds and loans) was made to meet interest payments alone.) By early 1840, there was talk in the state legislature and among politicians and other civic leaders of repudiating a portion of the state debt. The Canal Fund was able to make its $281,000 ($9,100,000 in 2025 dollars) interest payment in June 1840 only after the state (in March) approved $300,000 in new borrowing expressly to meet the interest payment. The Canal Fund was nearly out of cash again by November 1840. The fund commissioners asked the Ohio State Auditor for an advance of $200,000 ($6,500,000 in 2025 dollars), which was refused.

=== Canal Fund financial crisis of 1841 ===
In early 1841, the State Auditor warned the commissioners that $400,000 ($12,500,000 in 2025 dollars) would be needed pay the January 1842 interest payment. Instead of taking action to put the Canal Fund on a sound financial footing, the General Assembly asked the Canal Commission to expand construction and seek temporary loans to pay contractors and interest. (Note: The legislature authorized the Canal Fund Commission to seek $1 million ($31,200,000 in 2025 dollars) in loans to complete the Miami Canal Extension, Muskingum Improvement, Wabash and Erie Canal, and Walhonding Canal; authorized the commission to obtain $581,000 ($18,100,000 in 2025 dollars) in loans to pay existing debts to contractors; and authorized the commission to float $480,000 ($15,000,000 in 2025 dollars) in bonds to meet required investments under the Loan Law.)

Kelley and the other Canal Fund commissioners declined to borrow the money. Kelley discovered that New York City banks were unwilling to loan the Canal Fund Commission any money except on a short-term basis, and bonds could be sold only at a steep 25 percent discount of the par value and at high guaranteed interest rate (6 percent).

The Canal Fund Commission decided to seek loans from Ohio banks instead. Despite advertising widely, only two banks responded in April 1841. The first of these was the Bank of Chillicothe, which agreed to lend the Canal Fund $581,000 ($18,100,000 in 2025 dollars) at 6 percent interest. (Note: The loan had to be repaid swiftly: $100,000 in principal had to be repaid on May 1, 1842; $200,000 in principal on December 1, 1842; $100,000 in principal on March 1, 1843; and the remaining principal on May 1, 1843.) The Bank of Franklin, on whose board of directors Kelley still sat, agreed to loan the Canal Fund $500,000 ($15,600,000 in 2025 dollars) at 6 percent interest. (Note: This loan also had to be repaid swiftly: $50,000 in principal had to be repaid on November 1, 1841; $100,000 in principal on May 1, 1842; $100,000 in principal on December 1, 1842; and $200,000 in principal on June 1, 1843.) The loans were dispersed in banknotes, paper money similar to scrip but which was redeemed by the bank's own specie (rather than federal specie on deposit). Contractors, suppliers, and others accepted these banknotes only at a discount, and even then many doubted they could be redeemed. But the commissioners had no choice. Later in 1841, a third institution, the Bank of Wooster, agreed to loan the Canal Fund $199,355 ($6,200,000 in 2025 dollars) at 6 percent, the entire principal due in one year. These loans were not enough to cover essential costs, however, and the Canal Fund was forced to borrow $275,000 ($8,600,000 in 2025 dollars) in high-interest, very short-term loans from New York City banks.

All of these loans proved critical to helping the Canal Fund survive. The Canal Fund was able to make its interest payments and pay contractors about $580,000 ($18,100,000 in 2025 dollars). Without them, the canal fund would have had been all but bankrupt and would have stopped paying contractors for the entire year. (Note: Even with the loans, payments to contractors were irregular, and sometimes infrequent.)

The overall financial situation was still poor, however. The Canal Fund's total debt rose to $15.573 million ($486,000,000 in 2025 dollars) in 1841, and there was $1.6 million ($49,900,000 in 2025 dollars) in non-contractor current and accumulated liabilities. The Canal Fund commissioners were able to eliminate some of the current and accumulated liability by selling $1.3 million ($40,600,000 in 2025 dollars) in bonds at an average discount of about one-third (netting just $858,000).

By November 1841, the Canal Fund had a balance of $1,393 ($43,475 in 2025 dollars), with interest due in January 1842 of $400,000 ($13,300,000 in 2025 dollars) and a $300,000 ($10,000,000 in 2025 dollars) temporary loan due shortly thereafter. When General Assembly's legislative session opened in early December, there was immense pressure to repudiate all or a portion of the state's debt. To help prevent this, Kelley used his influence with the Ohio Life and Trust Co. (on whose board he still sat). Although it had no authorization to do so, the commission gave the Trust Co. $300,000 ($9,400,000 in 2025 dollars) in bonds in late 1841 and early 1842 as collateral for a $200,000 ($6,700,000 in 2025 dollars) loan. (The commission received the loan funds in March 1842.) Kelley and the other fund commissioners also illegally withdrew in late 1841 several large sums from the general tax fund of the Ohio State Treasury so that the Canal Fund Commission could make bond interest payments in January 1842. Although the Ohio State Auditor accused the Canal Fund Commission of fraud, their actions avoided certain default. According to historian Harry N. Scheiber, Kelley likely approved the highly irregular advances because he was convinced that revenues from the soon-to-be-finished canals would bring in substantial revenues a few months later that would allow these advances to be repaid swiftly.

=== Canal Fund financial crisis of 1842 ===
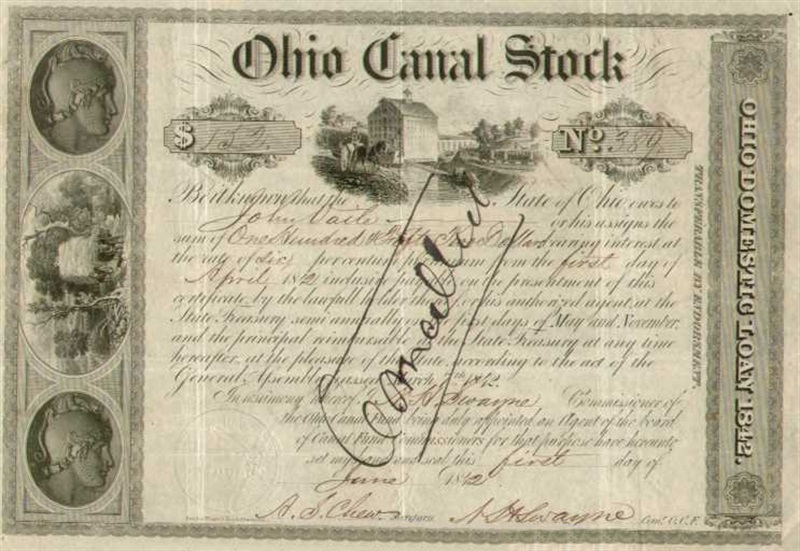
A Canal Fund Commission stock certificate issued in 1842

The Canal Fund's financial crisis continued through 1842, even though the depression was lifting and the Hocking Canal, Walhonding Canal, Warren County Canal, and the Muskingum Improvement (a branch canal and a series of locks and dams designed to improve navigability on the Muskingum River) were all completed (which not only meant the need for less borrowing but the beginning of tax and toll revenues from these works). Canal contractors were owed $1.4 million ($46,700,000 in 2025 dollars) by February 1842, but only two payments were made to them during following 10 months. Beginning in March 1842, the Canal Fund began issuing checks to non-contractor businesses to which it owed money. The checks were redeemable only in state bonds, and were rarely cashed because banks and businesses discounted them 30 to 50 percent below par.

Completion of these four canals was possible because work did not actually stop, despite the lack of payment to contractors. Some contractors declared bankruptcy and quit working, but the unfinished canals could not be abandoned because rain, snow, floods, and other factors would damage them. To complete the works and leave them in a state where they could be left idle, the Canal Commission was forced to hire new contractors at much higher rates of pay. Some contractors avoided bankruptcy by taking out loans from banks in Michigan. These banks paid in banknotes which proved nearly worthless, but in many cases it was enough to keep the contractor solvent. Other contractors kept working without pay. They believed the state would eventually meet its obligations and perhaps even compensate them extra for being patient.

Putting the Canal Fund Commission on a solid financial footing was paramount, and Kelley and the other Canal Fund commissioners heavily lobbied the Ohio General Assembly to act. It finally did so in March 1842 by repealing the Loan Law. With the Canal Fund still in deficit, the legislation also authorized the commissioners to sell more than $500,000 ($16,700,000 in 2025 dollars) in bonds so the fund could repay the Chillicothe and Franklin banks (Note: Kelley was able to sell these bonds in New York City in April. The amount of bonds sold was more than $667,000, because buyers would only purchase them at a 33 percent discount.) and to issue $500,000 in scrip so that contractors could be paid at least a portion of what they were owed. To ensure that this scrip was accepted, the legislature used its Wabash and Erie Canal lands as collateral. Notably, the law required the Canal Fund to issue scrip only in $100 ($3,336 in 2025 dollars) denominations. Kelley and the other fund commissioners, however, turned a blind eye when Ohio banks issued scrip in smaller denominations to meet the needs of contractors and workers.

The General Assembly also adopted legislation that suspended work on all branch and feeder canals and sidecuts, except for final work on the Wabash and Erie Canal and on those canals already under contract. About $1.5 million ($50,000,000 in 2025 dollars) was needed to fund this work. In the past, Canal Fund commissioners themselves traveled around the state and to New York City to sell these bonds. Now, however, the legislature required these bonds to be sold through brokers. The sale was successful, although the bonds had to pay 7 percent interest. (Note: To handle a federal budget surplus in 1836, Congress "deposited" with each state a percentage of the federal budget surplus. Ohio received about $2 million ($58,600,000 in 2025 dollars). Technically, the states were to pay this money back on demand. In practice, Ohio treated the money as a grant. It gave the money to each county, with the proviso that they use them for building schools or infrastructure. Although these funds had almost all been spent by 1842, the state pledged it as collateral for this bond sale, which is why the sale proved successful.) (Note: There is disagreement among sources as to how the work stoppage occurred. Historian Harry N. Scheiber says that Kelley and the other Canal Fund commissioners ordered the construction halt. Political scientist Ernest L. Bogart, however, points to the legislature as the source of the work stoppage. In its January 1842 annual report (probably written by Kelley himself), the Canal Fund Commission unanimously and expressly opposed a suspension of work on public infrastructure even though a majority of the commissioners want to halt work on all but the Wabash and Erie Canal and for the state to begin selling canal lands to fund that work.)

The General Assembly also agreed to the Canal Fund Commission's proposal to sell canal lands. The sale of these lands had essentially ceased in 1836. (Note: The Ohio General Assembly had been selling federally-ceded canal land at $1.25 ($38 in 2025 dollars) an acre for Miami Extension Canal lands and $2.50 ($76 in 2025 dollars) an acre for Wabash and Erie Canal lands. Both were beneath the market rate. The collapse of real estate prices, a precursor to the Panic of 1837, brought a halt to canal land sales in 1836. To raise funds, in 1838 the legislature required that all canal lands be appraised. Canal lands could now only be sold at their appraised price or $3.00 ($91 in 2025 dollars) an acre, whichever was higher. With the depression caused by the Panic of 1837 continuing, there were no buyers. Additionally, title to some lands were in dispute between February 1838 and late 1840, as the state of Ohio and the federal government argued about which lands Congress had ceded to the state. These title disputes also inhibited canal land sales.) A new law, adopted on March 8, 1842, permitted the sale of canal land at $2.50 ($83 in 2025 dollars) an acre or its appraised value, whichever was higher. The value of some Miami Extension Canal lands, which had sharply risen in value, was reduced by law to $4.00 ($121 in 2025 dollars) an acre. The law required that land be purchased only in "cash", which meant specie, banknotes from specie-paying banks, or state-issued scrip (essentially allowing contractors, paid in state-issued scrip, to redeem the scrip for valuable land).

Bonds still needed to be sold to raise revenue for the rest of 1842 and early 1843, and in April 1842 Kelley went to New York City to sell the bonds authorized by the legislature. Initially, he met with agents of overseas bond-holders to see if they were interested. They were not. Kelley then offered to insure the interest payments on the bonds, with his personal real estate as collateral for the insurance. When the agents still hesitated, Kelley signed a note in which he personally agreed to pay $10,000 ($300,000 in 2025 dollars) of the July 1842 interest payment. The agents accepted the note, bought the insurance, and agreed to purchase the bonds he was selling. To further boost confidence, Kelley also offered to accept canal bonds at par value in payment for any property he had for sale. Since the state's bonds were selling well below par value at the time, Kelley took considerable risk in making the offer. Kelley was forced to conceal how he had personally guaranteed the bonds and bond interest payments. If word had gotten out, it might have induced panic selling of canal fund bonds. (Note: The legislature actively considered a bill which barred the canal commissioners from raising any funds to pay off the temporary loans made by the New York City banks. This bill passed the Ohio House, and passed the Ohio Senate with amendments some time between midnight and 6 AM on March 7, 1842. The House asked for a conference committee, but the legislature adjourned at noon on March 7. Had the bill passed, it would have essentially bankrupted the canal commission fund. Deeply alarmed by the pending legislation, Kelley submitted a bill during the Senate's final hours in which the state pledged not only to pay its debts but also to reduce spending and issue such stock as necessary to pay off the debt. This legislation passed both chambers, and greatly improved the state's financial standing with Eastern investors.) Kelley also secured a $250,000 ($8,300,000 in 2025 dollars) loan from New York City banks, but once more only after personally guaranteeing the payment of interest.

Kelley traveled to the United Kingdom in the spring of 1842 to sell canal bonds to cover the July 1842 and January 1843 interest payments on existing bonds. Kelley personally conducted negotiations with Baring Brothers & Co. in attempt to sell bonds. Through the Ohio Life and Trust Co., Kelley had a pre-existing relationship with Barings: Baring Brothers had sold canal bonds on behalf of the Trust Company in Europe, and Barings itself owned some canal bonds. Kelley sold Baring Brothers $400,000 ($13,300,000 in 2025 dollars) of canal bonds at a 40 percent discount, netting $240,000 ($8,000,000 in 2025 dollars). When word of the bond sale became known in Ohio, Kelley's political opponents accused him of selling out the state in order to enrich his wealthy British business associates.

=== End of the Canal Fund financial crisis ===
In February 1843, Kelley once more relied on his banking friends and colleagues to secure the canal fund's solvency. Kelley and the other canal fund commissioners traveled to New York City to sell $1.5 million ($51,800,000 in 2025 dollars) in bonds. They were unable to sell the bonds at first, as investors expected Ohio to default on its debt. The commissioners then wrote and jointly published a statement outlining the state's financial situation, the financial status of the canal fund, and the progress on the Canal Commission's public works. By once more pledging the 1836 surplus and raising the interest rate on the bonds from 6 to 7 percent, they were able to sell all the securities.

The 1843 bond sale greatly stabilized the finances of the Canal Fund Commission and the state of Ohio. Canal Fund Commission checks, which were trading (but still not being cashed) at a 40 to 50 percent discount, now rose almost to par. Contractors began to be paid in specie-paying bank notes. (Note: The Canal Fund Commission issued another $210,000 ($7,300,000 in 2025 dollars) in bonds in 1844, and paid off all outstanding contractor debt.)

With the crisis over, the Ohio General Assembly reorganized the Canal Fund Commission in March 1843, and Kelley resigned from the board after the law passed. Despite the attacks on Kelley during the crisis, conservative Democrats joined with Whigs in the General Assembly to pass a resolution retroactively approving every measure he had taken to avoid default by the Canal Fund Commission. He was widely known as "savior of the state honor" for successfully helping the state to avoid default. According to historian Harry N. Scheiber, it is highly doubtful that Ohio would have avoided default and bankruptcy had Kelley and the other canal fund commissioners not had exceptionally close ties to Ohio and New York bankers. (Note: As the economy began growing swiftly again, Ohio was easily able to refinance its high-interest debt and permanently resolve its fiscal emergency. Work on the Miami Extension Canal was finished in 1845, which also greatly reduced the state's need for money. All other new canal construction ended in 1847.)

== Second return to the state legislature ==
Kelley's role in the Canal Fund Commission financial crisis left him with strong views about the state's banking system. His experience on the fund commission had not changed his belief in strong, centralized state government. However, rather than heavily regulate Ohio's banks, he now sought to strengthen state incentives for banks to engage in better decision-making. Like-minded individuals persuaded him to run for Ohio Senate in 1844 in order to pass banking reform legislation. Kelley ran for and won office to the state senate in 1844 and 1845.

During the 1844-1845 legislative session, Kelley was elected chairman of Ohio Senate's committee on currency and was a member of its committee on finance. On January 7, 1845, he introduced a bill to establish a State Bank of Ohio. The state bank was authorized to establish branches throughout the state to provide new capital to local banks and the public. The capital provided to local banks carried with it new requirements designed to strengthen and reform financial practices, thus lessening the likelihood of future bank failures. This, in turn, would encourage outside investment in Ohio. The second part of the bill concerned the issuance of new bank charters and the re-issuing of charters to banks whose charters expired. All state-chartered banks henceforth would be required to participate in a form of deposit insurance, limits were set on the rate of interest which could be charged (to avoid usury), and the size of loans given to any individual or firm were restricted (to help rein in risk-taking and reduce the likelihood that a single large loan default could ruin the bank).

Although strongly attacked by Democrats, Kelley's banking bill was adopted by the legislature almost unchanged. The Kelley bank bill ended much banking chaos and confusion in Ohio. As predicted, the banking legislation increased capital in Ohio at a time when it was sorely needed, and helped end much of the conflict of interest and mismanagement in the state's private banks.

Kelley also sought to reform the state tax code. He authored a comprehensive report on the tax system which the finance committee submitted to the Ohio Senate on February 17, 1845. As he had 26 years earlier, Kelley proposed taxing property according to its value, not its use. This time he was successful: The bill passed the General Assembly on March 2, 1846, and the parameters of the bill governed Ohio's tax code for more than a century.

== Early involvement with railroads ==
Even as Kelley was at work on the Ohio and Erie Canal, railroads were beginning to be built in Ohio. The first of these was the Erie and Kalamazoo Railroad on April 22, 1833. It was chartered by the Michigan Territory at a time when the border between the states of Michigan and Ohio was not settled. A portion of the railroad ended up within the borders of Ohio after the settlement of the Toledo War in 1836. Interest in railroads increased significantly after the Panic of 1837 ended. The state canal system was nearly overwhelmed with traffic, and investors saw railroads as a means of augmenting the canal system. Eastern investors were particularly interested in creating a system of integrated railroads that would extend from the Iowa Territory to the Atlantic Ocean.

Kelley first became involved with a railroad in 1836 when the Muskingum and Columbus Railroad was chartered by the Ohio General Assembly. This company intended to build a 55-mile (89 km) line from Zanesville west through the Licking Valley to Columbus. One of nine original incorporators of the company, Kelley became involved with the scheme because of the extensive construction management and financial knowledge he had gained while building the Ohio & Erie Canal. As with many early railroads, this one was never built.

=== Columbus and Xenia Railroad ===
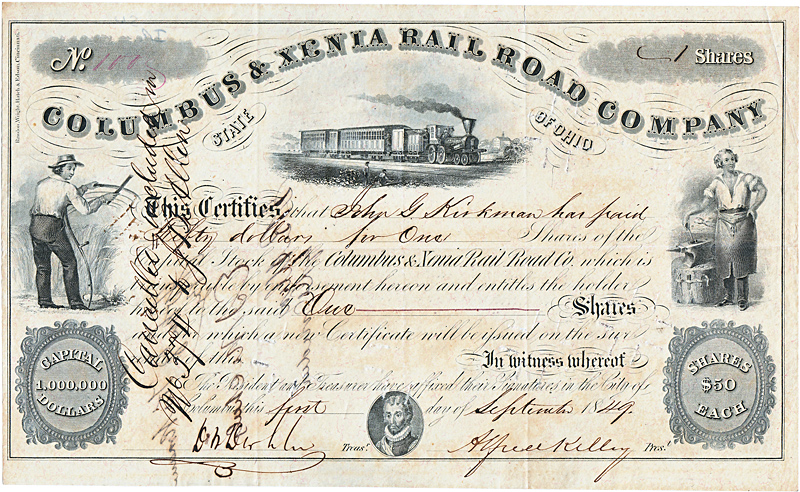
A Columbus & Xenia Railroad stock certificate issued in 1849, bearing Alfred Kelley's signature

The Columbus and Xenia Railroad (C&X) was chartered by the state of Ohio on March 12, 1844. The Little Miami Railroad, chartered some years earlier, was already under construction and would like Cincinnati and Xenia, Ohio, in 1845. The C&X would link Xenia to Columbus—creating the first rail link between Ohio's two largest cities. The incorporators of the C&X had difficulty raising funds and initiating construction, and no survey of the route had been made by February 1847.

Kelley agreed to become president of the railroad in 1847 at a salary of $500 ($17,277 in 2025 dollars) a year. With private investors unwilling to take a risk on the line, Kelley convinced city and county governments along the route to sell bonds and use the money to invest in the C&X. With this money in hand, Kelley was able to convince East Coast financiers that the railroad was a sound investment. He personally went to New York City to sell C&X bonds, and raised enough money to not only complete construction of the railroad but also to buy locomotives and rolling stock to equip it. Kelley also accompanied engineer Sylvester Medbery as he traveled the line's likely routes, the two men essentially surveying them together. Kelley then personally approved the route of the C&X. For the track, Kelley traveled to the United Kingdom and contracted with Sir John Guest & Co. of Wales for T rails. The C&X was one of the first railroads in Ohio to use T rails instead of strap rails. The 200 short tons (180 t) of rails did not arrive in Cleveland until July 1849, delaying the laying of track until the fall.

Work on the road began in October 1847, just months after Kelley assumed the line's presidency. The laying of track was complete on either February 19 or February 21, 1850, and regular service began on February 27. The C&X began generating substantial profits, and Kelley personally negotiated an agreement with the Little Miami Railroad which ensured an excellent working relationship between the two lines for many years.

Kelley stepped down as the C&X's president some time between May 4, 1852, and April 21, 1853.

== Cleveland, Columbus and Cincinnati Railroad ==
=== Election as president of the line ===
The Cleveland, Columbus and Cincinnati Railroad (CC&C) was chartered by the state of Ohio on March 14, 1836, and authorized to construct a railroad from Cleveland to Cincinnati, passing through the cities of Columbus and Wilmington. Fundraising failed, no construction occurred, and the charter lapsed. In 1845, a group of Cleveland business and civic leaders succeeded in persuading the Ohio General Assembly to revive the charter on March 12, 1845. Once more, the company failed to raise funds for the venture

Financier Edmund Dwight, representing the wealthy Dwight family of Massachusetts and New York, visited the city in August 1847. The Dwights and Kelleys had invested in the Commercial Bank of Lake Erie, and the Dwight family was strongly interested in Ohio railroads. Edmund Dwight told the board that improved investor confidence was needed to raise funds, and this required that the board seek a new leader who could ensure the efficient and timely construction of a well-built railroad. The president of the CC&C resigned and Alfred Kelley and Leonard Case Jr. were elected to the board of directors. Kelley was appointed president on August 13. (Note: Kelley had previously worked closely with three members of the board. William Dennison Jr. and Samuel Medary were both incorporators of the Columbus and Xenia Railroad, and were involved in bringing Kelley aboard as president of that line. Truman P. Handy was a director of the Commercial Bank of Lake Erie alongside Kelley.)

=== Raising funds and constructing the road ===
Kelley immediately began speaking with his colleagues in the banking and finance fields, and by early September 1847 indicated to the board that a favorable response had been found among investors in New York City. Kelley ordered construction of 10 miles (16 km) of track near Cleveland to test new construction methods and railroad technology. To ensure that the new charter did not lapse, on September 30, 1847, Kelley and other members of the board of directors went to Cleveland's Scranton Flats and ceremoniously filled a wheelbarrow with earth to symbolize the start of construction. The company hired an old man to work five days a week, continuously digging this trench, in order to prove to the state that construction was "ongoing".

Kelley also began to raise substantial funds. He began his tenure as president by urging the board of directors (composed of wealthy Ohioans) to show faith in the business by purchasing company bonds. By September 15, 1847, the board had invested $100,000 ($3,500,000 in 2025 dollars) in the CC&C. Kelley heavily promoted the railroad in Cleveland and by April 15, 1848, investors there had purchased $100,000 ($3,700,000 in 2025 dollars) in company bonds with pledges to purchase another $100,000 when the company asked. Kelley traveled to Cleveland in early August 1848, delivering a rousing one-hour speech which led listeners to purchase $73,000 ($2,700,000 in 2025 dollars) more in stock.

Kelley ordered the railroad's route resurveyed, a process which began in October 1847 and concluded about the end of January 1848. Engineers issued a new report to the board on August 19, 1848. The contract for construction was awarded to the firm of Stone, Harbach, and Witt on November 1. Harbach was one of the two engineers who had resurveyed the line in late 1847 and early 1848. Amasa Stone had worked with Harbach and another railroad engineer, Stillman Witt, while building railroad bridges in New England, and Kelley knew Stone well from his visits selling bonds back east. Kelley reached out to Stone, Harbach, and Witt, and asked them to build the railroad. The three men formed a company in late 1848 to do so, and agreed to take a portion of their pay in the form of railroad stock.

Kelley personally traveled to the United Kingdom in 1848 where he again contracted with Sir John Guest & Co. for T rails. (Note: All of the railroad's rails came from the United Kingdom.) The 7,000 short tons (6,400 t) of rail purchased was sufficient to lay half the road. Some 3,000 to 4,000 men were at work on the line at the end of July, completing the grading, constructing the track bed, and beginning to lay rail. With the cost of the main line appearing to hold steady at $2.5 million ($96,800,000 in 2025 dollars), Kelley personally went to New York City in July 1849 and sold another $400,000 ($15,500,000 in 2025 dollars) in bonds to keep the work going. He sold another $100,000 ($15,500,000 in 2025 dollars) in bonds to Ohio investors the same month.

The first 35 miles (56 km) of CC&C track, between Cleveland and Wellington, Ohio, opened about September 1, 1849. A train carrying Kelley and several board members toured the completed 15 miles (24 km) of track in mid-March 1850. Alfred Kelley was reelected president of the Cleveland, Columbus and Cincinnati Railroad in January 1850. With the company in need of more rail, Kelley traveled to New York City in late May, where he sold enough bonds to pay for the necessary iron. He then made a second trip to Britain to purchase more rail. He returned in mid-June having purchased another 5,000 short tons (4,500 t) of rail. The CC&C reached Shelby, Ohio, on November 12, 1850.

=== Celebratory completion trip ===
The Cleveland, Columbus and Cincinnati Railroad was completed on February 18, 1851. At 7 A.M. on February 18, Alfred Kelley and a party consisting of the railroad's directors, Columbus mayor Lorenzo English, and a number of other business and civic leaders departed on a special northbound train from Columbus. Kelley and Mayor English each laid a final rail on the line, and then Kelley drove the last spike at noon. The party reboarded the train and, after a salutary cannonade, proceeded to Cleveland. The train gave three whistles as it entered the city, which was returned by a three-cannon salute.

The CC&C began freight and passenger operations on February 21, 1851. To celebrate the event, Kelley invited Ohio Governor Reuben Wood, the entire Ohio General Assembly, the mayors and city councils of Cincinnati and Columbus, and numerous other local politicians and business leaders to travel at the railroad's expense on a four-day excursion trip from Columbus to Cleveland and back. The excursion train and its 425 passengers left Columbus on February 21. The following day, the excursionists watched a parade in Cleveland's Public Square. Although several politicians and local leaders spoke, Kelley declined to address the crowd. The excursion train returned to Columbus on February 24.

The completion of the Cleveland, Columbus and Cincinnati Railroad created the first direct rail link between Cleveland and Cincinnati.

== Cleveland, Painesville and Ashtabula Railroad ==
=== Election as first president of the railroad ===
In 1847, a group of businessmen from Ashtabula, Cuyahoga, and Lake counties undertook an effort to build Cleveland's railroad link to the east, and on February 18, 1848, they received a state charter for the Cleveland, Painesville and Ashtabula Railroad (CP&A). The line had authority to build a railroad from Cleveland to some point on the Ohio-Pennsylvania border. The stockholders met for the first time on August 1, 1849, and elected Herman B. Ely, George G. Gillett, Alfred Kelley, Tappan Lake, David R. Paige, Peleg P. Sanford, and Samuel L. Selden to the initial board of directors. Kelley was elected president, but due to other pressing business had to temporarily step aside. Herman Ely was named acting president until such time as Kelley could take up his duties.

Frederick Harbach surveyed the route for the CP&A in late 1849 and early 1850. In his report, issued at end of March 1850, he proposed two routes. Kelley reviewed both and chose the northern route. To construct the road, Kelley once more turned to the firm of Harbach, Stone & Witt, which won the CP&A construction contract on July 26, 1850. Financing for the road was never an issue, and construction proceeded swiftly. Regular trains began running on the 71-mile (114 km) line on November 20, 1851.

=== Role in creating the Franklin Canal Company railroad ===
The CP&A did not have the legal authority to build a railroad in Pennsylvania. The railroad soon discovered that the Franklin Canal Company (FCC) had been empowered by the Pennsylvania state legislature to build a railroad in April 1849. Railroad historian Anthony Churella says the CP&A's New York City-based financial backers first realized the value of the FCC's charter. However, Kelley biographer James L. Bates and Cleveland historian Harland Hatcher both claim it was Alfred Kelley who did so.

On July 5, 1849, the FCC issued $500,000 ($19,400,000 in 2025 dollars) in stock, with the CP&A purchasing $448,500 of it.

In addition to building north to the city of Erie, Pennsylvania, the FCC also intended to build a 25.5-mile (41.0 km) branch line along the shore of Lake Erie from Erie west to the Ohio-Pennsylvania border. Completion of this branch line (the "Lake Shore Division") would connect the CP&A with the Erie and North East Railroad (E&NE) and bring the FCC significant income with which to build its main line.

On January 10, 1850, Kelley agreed to connect the CP&A with the FCC at the Ohio-Pennsylvania border. This was superseded by a new agreement on August 26, 1850, under which the CP&A not only committed to connecting with the FCC but also to building and operating its lakeshore line. Kelley was able to commit to these agreements because the CC&C was generating large revenues. Kelley used these revenues to subsidize the construction of other important railroads in Ohio, which in turn gave him leverage to forge operating agreements with the CC&C once they opened.

The CC&C was completed in February 1851, and Alfred Kelley took up the CP&A presidency the following month. As the cost of building the FCC rose, the canal company decided to sell bonds to raise the necessary funds. Kelley offered to have the CP&A guarantee the bonds. The CP&A began construction on the Lake Shore Division shortly after November 1851 and the line was completed 12 months later.

=== Role in the Erie Gauge War ===
People in Pennsylvania were angry that the FCC's track gauge was the same as that of connecting railroads in New York and Ohio. This meant passengers and freight did not have to be transshipped at Erie, and threatened to allow the railroads to largely bypass Erie. The Erie Gauge War erupted, in which state and local authorities as well as mobs attempted to prevent completion of the Lake Shore Division. The Attorney General of Pennsylvania filed suit on October 12, 1852, to enjoin the Franklin Canal Company from opening its nearly-completed railroad. This threatened the CP&A's investment, as construction had only reached as far west as Crooked Creek. Although the Supreme Court of Pennsylvania overturned the injunction in January 1853, the court interpreted the FCC's charter to preclude the construction of any railroad within 5.5 miles (8.9 km) of the Ohio border.

Alarmed that the Lake Shore Division might not reach the state border, Alfred Kelley personally purchased the 5.5-mile (8.9 km) right of way. (Note: Although the FCC had enough funds in hand in December 1850 to purchase this land, it apparently had not yet done so.) Pennsylvania law permitted private individuals to construct "lateral railroads" to connect their factories, farms, mines, or other real estate to state-chartered railroads. (Note: The right to construct lateral railroads was granted in May 1932 in An Act Regulating Lateral Railroads, although they were restricted to 3 miles (4.8 km) in length and could only be constructed in Lycoming, Luzerne, Northumberland, and Schuylkill counties. The law was amended in March 1840 to permit lateral railroads up to 6 miles (9.7 km) in length in A Supplement to the Act Entitled "An Act Regulating Lateral Railroads". The state legislature extended the right to build lateral railroads to all parts of the state in April 1848 in An Act Relative to Margaret Parthmore and Relative to Lateral Railroads, Etc..) Kelley initially proposed that several less-prominent directors of and investors in the CP&A and FCC purchase the land and build this lateral railroad with funds provided by the CP&A, but none were willing to take the risk. Kelley went forward with the project on his own, using funds secretly provided by the CP&A. Kelley personally visited landowners along the route, making friends with them and buying the land he needed. In some cases, he was required to purchase entire farms. He also won passage of local ordinances permitting his lateral railroad to cross public roads. Kelley then had the line graded and constructed, and conveyed the lateral railroad to the FCC.

Kelley's actions did not end the Gauge War. By April 1853, the situation had so deteriorated that Kelley considered bypassing Erie altogether and connecting the CP&A to existing railroad lines which routed traffic through Pittsburgh. The people of Erie were further alarmed when the CP&A took over operation of the FCC's Lake Shore Division on December 1, 1853. On December 7, mobs tore up the FCC's track, demolished several of its bridges, and assaulted railroad officials. Kelley threatened to raise a private militia to protect FCC property if the state could or would not do so. Rioters tore up railroad track again in January 1854.

Tensions died down considerably when, on January 28, 1854, the Pennsylvania General Assembly enacted legislation repealing the FCC's charter. Pennsylvania Governor William Bigler seized the FCC on January 30, and appointed William F. Packer as the company's superintendent. The CP&A continued to operate the FCC on behalf of the state, forwarding 47 percent of all revenues generated by the Lake Shore Division to the state treasury.

=== Resignation ===
To further placate certain Pennsylvanians, Kelley resigned as president of the CP&A in February 1854, and was replaced by William Case. The state of Pennsylvania had no interest in running a railroad, and in May 1854 the Pennsylvania General Assembly enacted new legislation permitting the CP&A to build a line from the Ohio-Pennsylvania border east to Erie. The law allowed the CP&A to purchase the FCC, provided that the CP&A invested in a nearby Pennsylvania railroad. The CP&A, which already owned the FCC, assumed title to the Lake Shore Division.

With the CP&A link between Cleveland and Erie (and the east coast) complete, Kelley negotiated a contract under which the CC&C and CP&A jointly operated the CP&A's line.

== Third return to the state legislature ==
=== Health problems ===
Kelley took a leave of absence from the CC&C presidency in early October 1851. He resigned his position at the railroad about May 24, 1853, and was replaced by Henry Payne (who had unofficially been acting president for some time already). Kelley retained his directorships on the CC&C and CP&A until his death.

Having long suffered from malaria contracted while working on canal system, Kelley was in extremely poor health after six years leading three railroads. After stepping down as CP&A president, he went to Europe for an extended vacation, not returning until early May 1854.

=== Final legislative term ===
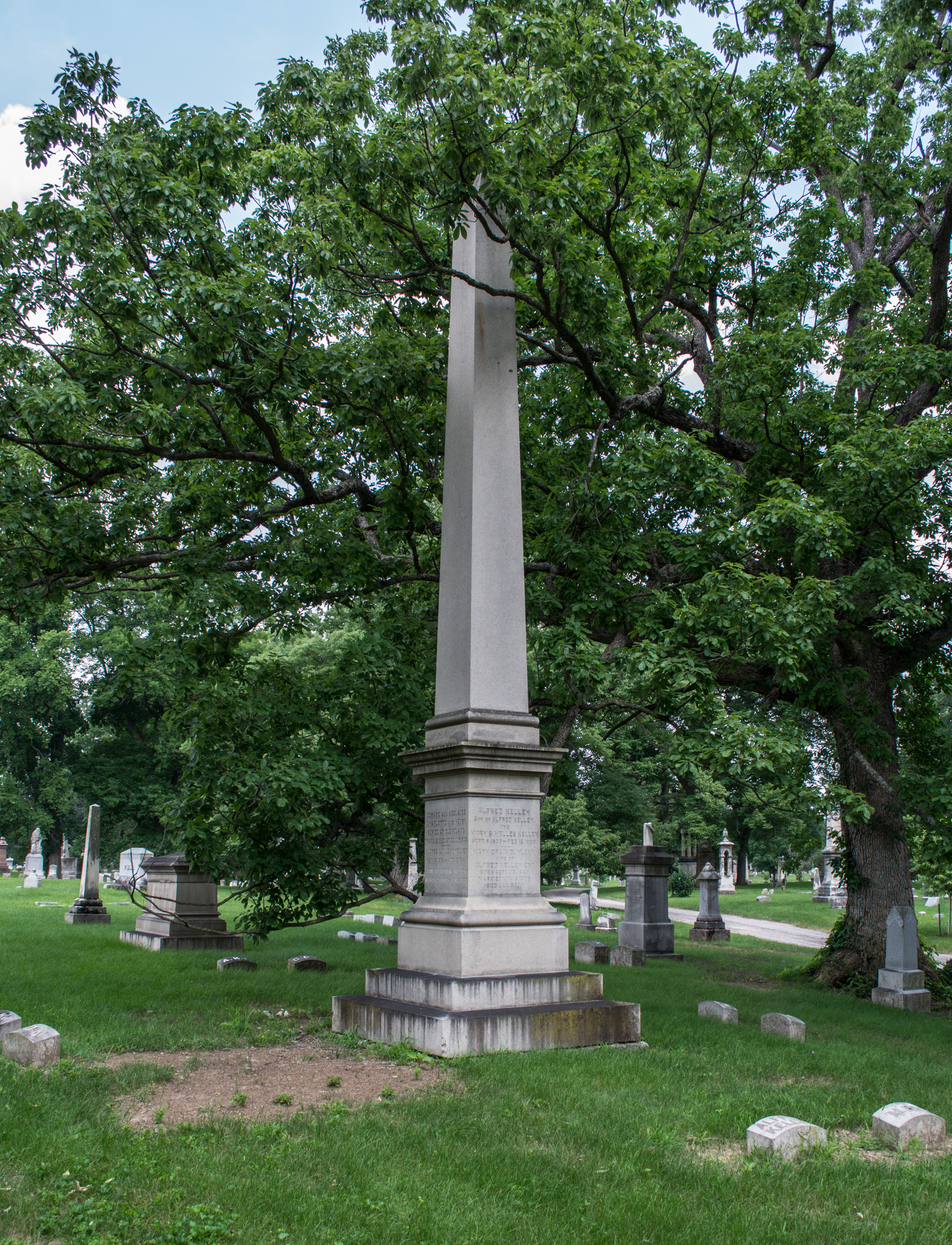
Grave of Alfred Kelley at Green Lawn Cemetery in Columbus, Ohio

After returning from Europe, Kelley was offered the presidency of several railroads on Ohio. He declined all opportunities, feeling that these railroads were parochial efforts that would not benefit the state was a whole.

The deteriorating national political situation led Kelley to re-enter politics. The U.S. Supreme Court heard oral argument in the case of Dred Scott v. Sandford, 60 U.S. (19 How.) 393 (1857), in February 1856. Deeply alarmed by the worsening political discourse concerning slavery and worried by Ohio's deteriorating state finances, Kelley once more decided to seek election to the Ohio General Assembly. He sought and won a seat in the Ohio Senate in 1856, becoming the oldest legislator in either branch of the General Assembly in the 1856–1857 term.

Kelley led an investigation into whether Ohio could impose due process requirements on the federal Fugitive Slave Act of 1850, but this led to no legislation being introduced. As chair of the Senate finance committee, he forced an investigation into Ohio State Treasurer William Harvey Gibson. Extensive evidence of check kiting, conflict of interest, embezzlement, and fraud were uncovered, and Gibson resigned in disgrace. Kelley sponsored two successful bills which placed tighter controls on the state treasurer, but had few other legislative accomplishments that term.

== Personal life ==
Kelley married Mary Seymour Welles of Lowville, New York, on either August 25 or August 27, 1816. He purchased a one-horse chaise in Lowville, and drove to Buffalo in it. Their schooner for Cleveland was not yet ready to sail, so they traveled to Niagara Falls. Upon their return, they discovered the ship had sailed, so they rode in the chaise from Buffalo to Cleveland. Theirs was the first carriage ever seen in Cleveland.

The Kelleys had had 11 children: Maria (1818–1887), Jane (1820–1897), Charlotte (1822–1828), Edward (1824–1825), Adelaide (June–September 1826), Henry (1828–1830), Helen (April 3, 1831), Frank (1834–1838), Annie (1836–1888), Alfred (1839–1909), and Katherine (1841–1918).

== Death and legacy ==
For portions of 1856, Kelley was severely ill and confined to home. His health noticeably declined during his last term in the state legislature, and he was once more confined to his home several times in 1857.

Physicians could not determine the nature of Kelley's illness, even as he lost weight and his energy declined. From 1857 to 1859, he became increasingly paralyzed. He was feeble for the last few months before his death, and fell into a coma on November 28. He died at his home in Columbus on December 2, 1859. Kelley was interred at Green Lawn Cemetery in Columbus, Ohio. His estate was worth $250,000 ($9,000,000 in 2025 dollars).

Historians consider Kelley one of the most dominant commercial, financial, and political people in the state of Ohio in the first half of the 1800s. He is widely considered the "architect" of Ohio's canal and railroad systems.

== Bibliography ==
- Acts of a Local Nature Passed at the First Session of the Thirty-Fourth General Assembly of the State of Ohio. Volume 34. Columbus, Ohio: James B. Gardiner, State Printer. 1836.
- Avery, Elroy McKendree (1918). A History of Cleveland and Its Environs: The Heart of New Connecticut. Volume 1. Chicago: Lewis Publishing Co.
- Avery, Elroy McKendree (1918). A History of Cleveland and Its Environs: The Heart of New Connecticut. Volume II. Chicago: Lewis Publishing Co.
- Ayers, Edward L.; Gould, Lewis L.; Oshinsky, David M.; Soderland, Jean R. (2006). American Passages: A History of the United States. Boston, Mass.: Wadsworth/Cengage Learning. ISBN 9780618914067.
- Ball, George W.I. (1884). General Railroad and Telegraph Laws of the State of Pennsylvania. Philadelphia: Allen, Lane & Scott.
- Bates, James L. (1888). Alfred Kelley: His Life and Work. Columbus, Ohio: Press of R. Clarke & Co.
- Bennett, William A. (1904). "Banking in Cleveland". Annals of the Early Settlers Association of Cuyahoga County. Volume V. Cleveland: Early Settlers Association of Cuyahoga County.
- Biographical and Historical Memoirs of Muskingum County, Ohio. Chicago: The Goodspeed Publishing Co. 1892.
- Bogart, Ernest L. (April 1911). "The State Debt of Ohio" (PDF). Journal of Political Economy. 19 (4): 249–266. doi:10.1086/251838. S2CID 154531921.
- Brown, Marion A. (1998). The Second Bank of the United States and Ohio (1803-1860): A Collision of Interests. Lewiston, N.Y.: Edwin Mellen Press. ISBN 9780773483545.
- Camp, Mark J. (2007). Railroad Depots of Northeast Ohio. Charleston, S.C.: Arcadia Publishing. ISBN 9780738551159.
- Canal Fund Commission (January 21, 1842). Annual Report of the Commissioners of the Canal Fund, of the State of Ohio, Made to the Fortieth General Assembly. Doc. No 49. Columbus, Ohio: Samuel Medary, State Printer. hdl:2027/chi.78251504.
- Canal Fund Commission (December 27, 1842). Annual Report of the Commissioners of the Canal Fund, of the State of Ohio, Made to the Forty First General Assembly. Doc. No 29. Columbus, Ohio: Samuel Medary, State Printer. hdl:2027/osu.32435074906009.
- "Case of the Franklin Canal Company". Journal of the Senate of the Commonwealth of Pennsylvania, Commenced at Harrisburg, Tuesday the Fourth Day of January, In the Year of Our Lord One Thousand Eight-Hundred and Fifty-Three. Volume II. Harrisburg, Pa.: Theo. Fenn & Co., Printers to the State. 1853.
- Churella, Albert J. (2013). The Pennsylvania Railroad. Volume 1: Building an Empire, 1846-1917. Philadelphia: University of Pennsylvania Press. ISBN 9780812243482.
- Cincinnati, Hamilton, and Dayton Railroad (1854). Statement of the Existing Controversy Between the Two Lines of Railroads From Cincinnati to Lake Erie. Cincinnati, Ohio: Cincinnati Gazette Company, Printer. hdl:2027/chi.26452099.
- Cole, Chester (2001). A Fragile Capital: Identity and the Early Years of Columbus, Ohio. Columbus, Ohio: Ohio State University Press. ISBN 9780814208533.
- Federal Reserve Bank of Cleveland (1976). Annual Report, 1976 (Report). Cleveland: Federal Reserve Bank of Cleveland.
- Fess, Simeon D. (1937). Ohio: A Four-Volume Reference Library on the History of a Great State. Volume 4: Ohio's Three Hundred. Chicago: Lewis Publishing Co.
- Franklin Canal Company (1851). Pennsylvania Section of the Erie and Cleveland Railroad. New York: William W. Rose, stationer. hdl:2027/ien.35556042945196.
- Franklin Canal Company (1853). "Report of the Franklin Canal Company". Journal of the Senate of the Commonwealth of Pennsylvania, Commenced at Harrisburg, Tuesday the Fourth Day of January, In the Year of Our Lord One Thousand Eight-Hundred and Fifty-Three. Volume II (Report). Harrisburg, Pa.: Theo. Fenn & Co., Printers to the State. pp. 355–359.
- Galbreath, Charles B. (1925). History of Ohio. Volume 2. Chicago: The American Historical Society. hdl:2027/mdp.39015070269074.
- Gieck, Jack (1988). A Photo Album of Ohio's Canal Era, 1825-1913. Kent, Ohio: Kent State University Press. ISBN 9780873383530.
- Gold, David M. (2004). "The General Assembly and Ohio's Constitutional Culture". In Benedict, Michael Les; Winkler, John F. (eds.). The History of Ohio Law. Athens, Ohio: Ohio University Press. ISBN 9780821415467.
- Grinde, Donald A. Jr. (January 1974). "Erie's Railroad War: A Case Study of Purposive Violence for a Community's Economic Advancement". Western Pennsylvania Historical Magazine: 15–23.
- Haddad, Gladys (2007). Flora Stone Mather: Daughter of Cleveland's Euclid Avenue and Ohio's Western Reserve. Kent, Ohio: Kent State University Press. ISBN 9780873388993.
- Haeger, John Dennis (1981). The Investment Frontier: New York Businessmen and the Economic Development of the Old North-West. Albany, N.Y.: State University of New York Press. ISBN 9780873955317.
- Harbach, Frederick (1850). Report on the Preliminary Surveys for the Cleveland, Painesville and Ashtabula Railroad Company. Cleveland: Sanford & Hayward.
- Harbach, Frederick; Childe, John (1848). Report on the surveys, estimates and income of the Cleveland, Columbus and Cincinnati Railroad. Cleveland: Smead & Cowles. hdl:2027/njp.32101066800754.
- Hatcher, Harlan (1988). "Building the Railroads". In Lupold, Harry Forrest; Haddad, Gladys (eds.). Ohio's Western Reserve: A Regional Reader. Kent, Ohio: Kent State University Press. ISBN 9780873383639.
- Havighurst, Walter (1977). Ohio: A Bicentennial History. New York: Norton. ISBN 9780393056136.
- Heidler, David S.; Heidler, Jeanne T. (2010). Henry Clay: The Essential American. New York: Random House. ISBN 9781588369956. "jackson."
- Hill, Leonard U. (1957). John Johnston and the Indians: In the Land of the Three Miamis. Columbus, Ohio: Stoneman Press.
- Hooper, Osman Castle (1920). History of the City of Columbus, Ohio, From the Founding of Franklinton in 1797, Through the World War Period to the Year 1920. Columbus, Ohio: Memorial Publishing Co.
- Huntington, C.C. (1915). "A History of Banking and Currency in Ohio Before the Civil War". Ohio Archæological and Historical Publications. Cleveland: Fred J. Herr.
- Hurst, James Willard (2001). A Legal History of Money in the United States, 1774-1970. Washington, D.C.: Beard Books. ISBN 9781587980985.
- Ingham, Mary Bigelow (1893). Women of Cleveland and Their Work, Philanthropic, Educational, Literary, Medical and Artistic. Cleveland: Ingham, Clarke, & Co.
- Johnson, Crisfield (1879). History of Cuyahoga County, Ohio. Cleveland: D.W. Ensign & Co.
- Kelley, Hermon Alfred (1897). A Genealogical History of the Kelley Family Descended From Joseph Kelley of Norwich, Connecticut, With Much Biographical Matter Concerning the First Four Generations and Notes of Inflowing Female Lines. Cleveland: H.A. Kelley.
- Kennedy, James Harrison (March 1886). "Alfred Kelley". Magazine of Western History. pp. 550–557.
- Kennedy, James Harrison (1896). A History of the City of Cleveland: Its Settlement, Rise and Progress, 1796-1896. Cleveland: Imperial Press.
- Kennedy, David M.; Cohen, Lizbeth; Piehl, Mel (2017). The Brief American Pageant: A History of the Republic. Boston: Cengage Learning. ISBN 9781285193298.
- Kent, Donald H. (October 1948). "The Erie War of the Gauges". Pennsylvania History: 253–275.
- Korenko, Leslie (2009). Kelleys Island: The Courageous, Poignant and Often Quirky Lives of Island Pioneers, 1810-1861. Kelleys Island, Ohio: The Wine Press. ISBN 9780981961217.
- Larick, Roy; Gibbons, Bob; Siplock, Edward (2005). Euclid Creek. Charleston, S.C.: Arcadia Publishing. ISBN 9780738539539.
- Lee, Alfred E. (1892). History of the City of Columbus, Capital of Ohio. Volume 1. New York: Munsell & Co.
- Lupold, Harry Forrest; Haddad, Gladys (1988). "Conquest and Settlement: Native Americans to New Englanders". In Lupold, Harry Forrest; Haddad, Gladys (eds.). Ohio's Western Reserve: A Regional Reader. Kent, Ohio: Kent State University Press. ISBN 9780873383639.
- Martin, William T. (1858). History of Franklin County: A Collection of Reminiscences of the Early Settlement of the County. Columbus, Ohio: Follett, Forster & Co.
- Marvin, Walter Rumsey (July 1954). "Ohio's Unsung Penitentiary Railroad". Ohio State Archaeological and Historical Quarterly: 254–269.
- Meints, Graydon M. (1992). Michigan Railroads and Railroad Companies. East Lansing, Mich.: Michigan State University Press. ISBN 9780870133183.
- Memorial Record of the County of Cuyahoga and City of Cleveland, Ohio. Chicago: The Lewis Publishing Co. 1894.
- Michigan Railroad Commission (1877). "Fifth Annual Report of the Commissioner of Railroads of the State of Michigan, for the Year Ending December 31, 1876". Report of the Commissioner of Railroads. Lansing, Mich.: W.S. George and Co., State Printers and Binders: 34 v. hdl:2027/njp.32101066784305.
- Miller, Charles C.; Baxter, Samuel A. (1906). History of Allen County, Ohio, and Representative Citizens. Chicago: Richmond & Arnold.
- Morrow, Josiah (1883). The History of Brown County, Ohio. Chicago: W.H Beers & Co.
- Myers, John; Cetina, Judith G. (2015). Irish Cleveland. Charleston, S.C.: Arcadia Publishing. ISBN 9781467113496.
- Ninth Annual Report of the President and Directors of the Lake Shore and Michigan Southern Railway Company to the Stockholders for the Fiscal Year Ending December 31, 1878 (Report). Cleveland: Fairbanks & Co. 1879.
- Norton, Mary Beth; Kamensky, Jane; Sheriff, Carol; Blight, David W.; Chudacoff, Howard (2015). A People and a Nation: A History of the United States. Stamford, Conn.: Cengage Learning. ISBN 9781133312727.
- Oeters, Bill; Gulick, Nancy (2014). Miami and Erie Canal. Charleston, S.C.: Arcadia Publishing. ISBN 9781467112536.
- Ohio Commissioner of Railroads and Telegraphs (1868). "Annual Report of the Commissioner of Railroads and Telegraphs, to the Governor of the State of Ohio, for the Year 1867". Annual Report of the Commissioner of Railroads and Telegraphs, to the Governor of the State of Ohio, for the Year. Columbus, Ohio: L.D. Myers & Bro., State Printers: 38 v. in 39. hdl:2027/njp.32101066796929.
- Ohio Commissioner of Railroads and Telegraphs (1871). Annual Report of the Commissioner of Railroads and Telegraphs, for the Year Ending June 30, 1870, In Two Volumes. Volume II. Columbus, Ohio: Nevins and Myers, State Printers.
- Ohio Commissioner of Railroads and Telegraphs (1874). Seventh Annual Report of the Commissioner of Railroads and Telegraphs of Ohio for the Year Ending June 30, 1873. Columbus, Ohio: Nevins and Myers, State Printers.
- Ohio Commissioner of Railroads and Telegraphs (1888). Annual Report of the Commissioner of Railroads and Telegraphs, to the Governor of the State Ohio, for the Year 1887. Columbus, Ohio: The Westbote Company, State Printers.
- Ohio Commissioner of Railroads and Telegraphs (1901). The Thirty-Fourth Annual Report of the Commissioner of Railroads and Telegraphs, to the Governor of the State Ohio, for the Year 1901. Columbus, Ohio: F.J. Heer, State Printer.
- Ohio Commissioner of Railroads and Telegraphs (1906). The Thirty-Eighth Annual Report of the Commissioner of Railroads and Telegraphs, to the Governor of the State Ohio, for the Year 1905. Columbus, Ohio: The Springfield Publishing Company, State Printers.
- Ohio Secretary of State (1848). Acts of a General Nature Passed By the Forty-Sixth General Assembly of the State of Ohio. Volume XLVI. Columbus, Ohio: Chas. Scott's Steam Press.
- Ohio Secretary of State (1885). Annual Report of the Secretary of State to the Governor of Ohio for the Year 1884. Columbus, Ohio: The Westbote Co., State Printers.
- Orth, Samuel Peter (1910). A History of Cleveland, Ohio. Volume I. Chicago: S.J. Clarke Publishing Co.
- Orth, Samuel Peter (1910). A History of Cleveland, Ohio. Volume II: Biography. Chicago: S.J. Clarke Publishing Co.
- Remini, Robert V. (1984). Andrew Jackson and the Course of American Democracy, 1833–1845. New York: Harper & Row. ISBN 9780060152796.
- Remini, Robert V. (1991). Henry Clay: Statesman for the Union. New York: W.W. Norton. ISBN 9780393030044.
- Report of the Proceedings of a Convention of Delegates From Railroad Companies, Held in Columbus, May 4, 1852. Columbus, Ohio: Scott & Bascom, Printers. 1852. hdl:2027/miun.aft9076.0001.001.
- Rhodes, James Ford (1919). History of the United States From the Compromise of 1850. Volume 3. New York: Harper & Bros.
- Rose, William Ganson (1990). Cleveland: The Making of a City. Kent, Ohio: Kent State University Press. ISBN 9780873384285.
- Rothbard, Murray N. (2012). The Panic of 1819: Reactions and Policies. Auburn, Ala.: Ludwig von Mises Institute. ISBN 9781933550084.
- Roy, William G. (1999). Socializing Capital: The Rise of the Large Industrial Corporation in America. Princeton, N.J.: Princeton University Press. ISBN 9780691010342.
- Rutland, Robert Allen (1995). The Democrats: From Jefferson to Clinton. Columbia, Mo.: University of Missouri Press. ISBN 9780826210340.
- Scheiber, Harry N. (1968). The Ohio Canal Era: A Case Study of Government and the Economy, 1820-1861. Athens, Ohio: Ohio University Press.
- Scheiber, Harry N. (Summer 1975). "Land Reform, Speculation, and Government Failure: The Administration of Ohio's State Canal Lands, 1836-1860". Prologue: The Journal of the National Archives: 85–89. hdl:2027/uc1.b5181423.
- Scheiber, Harry N. (Autumn 1978). "Alfred Kelley and the Ohio Business Elite, 1822-1859". Ohio History: 354–392.
- Schwieterman, Joseph P. (2001). When the Railroad Leaves Town: American Communities in the Age of Rail Line Abandonment. Kirksville, Mo.: Truman State University Press. ISBN 9780943549989.
- Spiegelman, Mortimer (July 1948). "The Failure of the Ohio Life Insurance and Trust Company, 1857". Ohio History Journal: 247–265.
- Stampp, Kenneth Milton (1992). America in 1857: A Nation on the Brink. New York: Oxford University Press. ISBN 9780195074819.
- Taylor, William Alexander; Taylor, Aubrey Clarence (1899). Ohio Statesmen and Annals of Progress, From the Year 1788 to the Year 1900. Volume I. Columbus, Ohio: Press of the Westbote Co.
- Taylor, William Alexander; Taylor, Aubrey Clarence (1899). Ohio Statesmen and Annals of Progress, From the Year 1788 to the Year 1900. Volume II. Columbus, Ohio: Press of the Westbote Co.
- Thomas, William B. (Fall 1920). "Early History of the Old Bee Line R.R. and Its Completion By Hon. Alfred Kelley in 1851". Firelands Pioneer: 104–122.
- Vernon, Edward (1873). "American Railroad Manual for the United States and the Dominion". American Railroad Manual. Philadelphia: J.B. Lippincott & Co. hdl:2027/njp.32101066799089.
- Voight, Norman R. (2017). Transportation Depth Reference Manual for the Civil PE Exam. Belmont, Calif.: Professional Publications. ISBN 9781591264682.
- Waldstreicher, David (2013). A Companion to John Adams and John Quincy Adams. Malden, Mass: Wiley-Blackwell. ISBN 9780470655580.
- Way, Peter (2009). Common Labour: Workers and the Digging of North American Canals, 1780-1860. Cambridge, U.K.: Cambridge University Press. ISBN 9780521102650.
- Weiner, Ronald R. (2005). Lake Effects: A History of Urban Policy Making in Cleveland, 1825-1929. Columbus, Ohio: Ohio State University Press. ISBN 9780814209899.
- Whittlesey, Charles (1867). Early History of Cleveland. Cleveland: Fairbanks, Benedict, & Co., Printers.
- Wickham, Gertrude Van Rensselaer (1914). The Pioneer Families of Cleveland 1796–1840. Volume 1. Cleveland: Evangelical Publishing House.
- Wikoff, Allen T. (1875). Annual Report of the Secretary of State to the Governor of the State of Ohio for the Year 1874. Columbus, Ohio: Nevins & Myers, State Printers.
- Wittke, Carl Frederick; Bond, Beverley W.; Utter, William T.; Weisenburger, Francis P.; Roseboom, Eugene H.; Jordan, Philip D.; Lindley, Harlow (1941). The History of the State of Ohio. Volume 3: The Passing of the Frontier, 1825-1850. Columbus, Ohio: Ohio State Archaeological and Historical Society.
- Woods, Terry K. (1995). The Ohio and Erie Canal: A Glossary of Terms. Kent, Ohio: Kent State University Press. ISBN 9780873385220.
