= William Parsons Winchester Dana =

American painter

- Born: 18 February 1833; Boston, Massachusetts, U.S.
- Died: 8 April 1927 (aged 94); London, England, U.K.
- Education: Chauncy Hall School; Boston Latin School
- Occupation: Artist
- Spouse: Anna Bronson Murray (m. 1855; died 1915)
- Children: 6
- Parent(s): Samuel Dana; Nancy Winchester
- Relatives: James Boyles Murray (father-in-law)

William Parsons Winchester Dana (18 February 1833 – 8 April 1927) was an American artist who settled in France. Later he emigrated to London, and became a naturalised British Subject. His paintings were generally small, painted with oils on canvas in an anglicized tradition. Dana's transatlanticism influenced Monet and the French impressionists, whom he met in Paris and Normandy. But his most enduring feature as an artist was a highly personalised, naturalistic style, intimate and affective of familiarity. Yet he remained very much in the romantic vein of older painters from an earlier period, essentially conservative, but observant of minute detail.

== Early life ==
William Parsons Dana was born in Boston, Massachusetts on February 18, 1833. He was the son of Samuel Dana, a banker, and Nancy, daughter of Peter Winchester of Boston. He studied at the Chauncy Hall School and graduated from the Boston Latin School, intended for the law, but being from a large wealthy family was not short of money. He left home early and spent much time in New Hampshire, teaching himself to draw at Manchester, NH, learning to sketch in the early 1850s. Like so many American genre painters his early works were dominated by the attraction of rural landscapes that went down to the sea. The animals and children emerged at first in context, and then grew in importance as his career developed.

== Career ==
Dana was attracted to a sailor's life, and made several voyages, then decided to study art, went to Paris in 1852, became a pupil of Picot and Le Poitevin and a student in the School of arts, and spent his summers sketching in Normandy and Brittany. Some of his earliest sketches are of Manchester, MA.

After marrying in 1855, the Danas made their first foray to Paris, France, where he occasionally went to the French salon, but decided to return when the U.S. Civil War erupted. He returned to the United States in 1862, was chosen a full member of the National Academy of Design in 1863, painted in New York City and Newport, Rhode Island, where two years later some of his works found their way to the National Academy as donations by the late James A Suydam.

Thereafter he emigrated to establish his studio in Paris, France, where he returned after the end of the U.S. Civil War. For the next twelve years he lived and worked in Paris, visiting the many impressionist painters in Normandy and painting many of the same scenes, notably the Rock at Etretat, much favored by Monet. Known as the American Impressionist, he lived with his wife at Rue St Honore Faubourg, Paris, had a studio in the city in some contentment. He often visited Normandy. Among his many paintings there were those of Le Havre and The Rock at Etretat.

In 1878, he moved to London with his daughter, Marion for her prospective marriage to a London barrister. That summer he won an International Gold Medal at the Paris Exposition. Dana continued to paint in London, notably the famous view across the Thames to the Palace of Westminster, and Waterloo Bridge, as well as several of the pea-soup fog shrouding the river. His generic paintings included many of donkeys, on beaches, and so on, and others of animals and children. But Dana was probably best known for his seascapes, especially for a self-portrait depicting him wearing sou-wester oilskins. He exhibited at the Society of Artists in Birmingham, England.

=== Works ===
His first pictures were marine views, but subsequently he treated genre subjects with success, and was happy in painting children, horses, and dogs. Some of his principal works are:

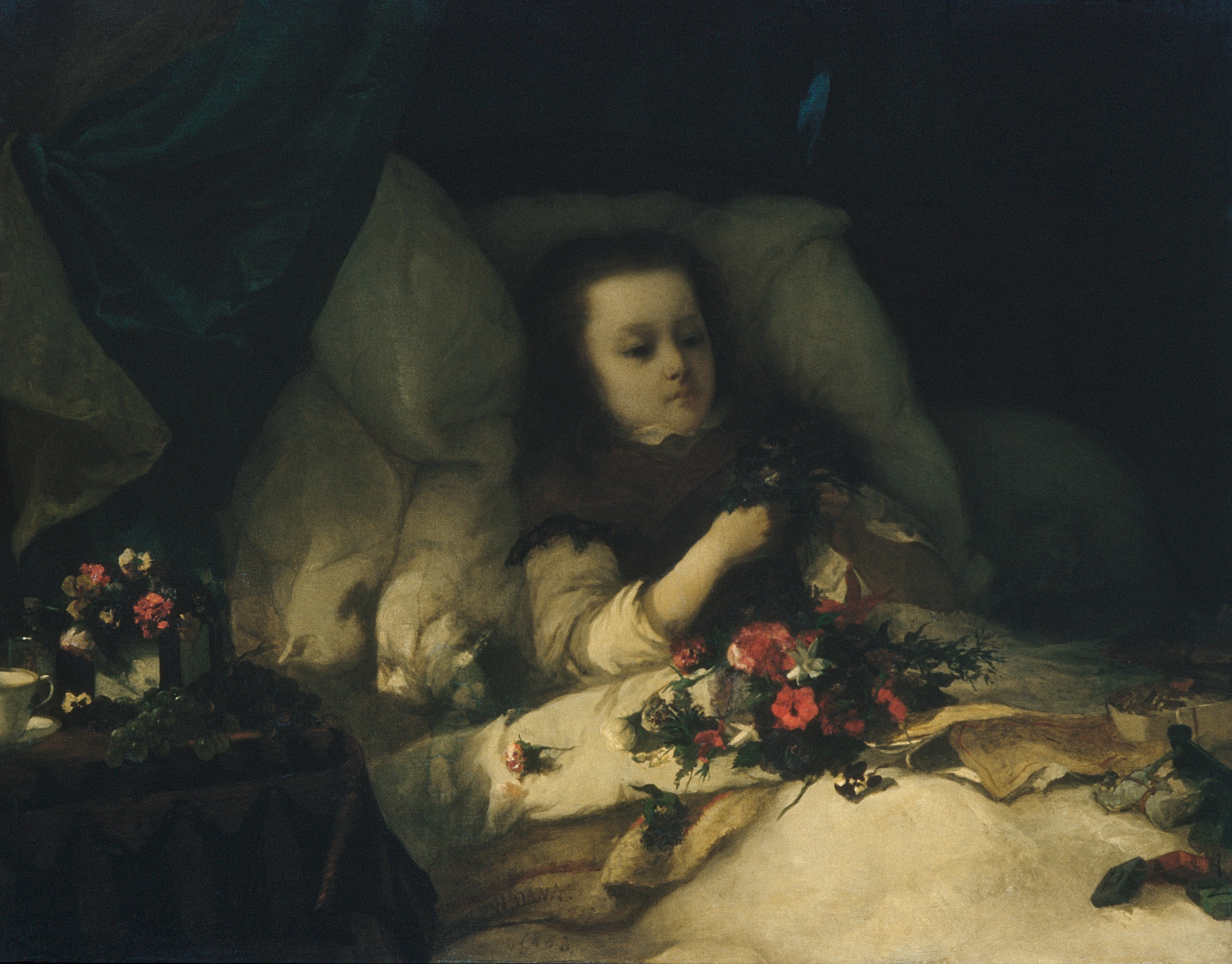
Heart's Ease, 1863

- View of Dieppe (+ 11 others; 12 works, various sizes), 1857–1909
- Morning On The Beach, 1859, oil on canvas
- Sailing on Calm Seas, 1861
- Heart's Ease, 1863
- On the beach, 1876
- Les barques au coucher du soleil, 1879
- Chase of the Frigate Constitution
- Waiting for the Fishing-Boat
- Low Tide at Yport
- French Peasant-Girl
- Maternal Care
- Emby's Admirals
- Breakers, 1880
- Fisherman Facing Rough Seas, 1887
- Land of Nod
- English Greyhound
- The Seaweed Gatherers
- Bord de mer, 1903
- Collecting the wrack, 1910
- The U.S. frigate Constitution chased by an English squadron, July 1812, 1862
- Biarritz - Seascape
- Gathering seaweed, 1910
- Golf course - le Touquet, 1910
- Of the French coast, moonlight
- Coastal view, 1910
- Cottage
- A Country Lane, 1909
- A Cottage in a Country Lane, 1909
- Biarritz
- Snowscene
- Coastal scene with two fishing boats berthed on the beach
- Collecting the Wrack, oil on canvas, signed and dated 1910

== Personal life ==
On December 27, 1855, in Paris, France, Dana married Anna Bronson Murray (1831–1915), daughter of Colonel James Boyles Murray of New York and Maria Bronson, daughter of the New York banker, Isaac Bronson. Together, they had six children, including:

- Marian Caroline Dana (b. 1857), who married Wilson Noble (1854–1917), an MP for Hastings. Their daughter, Lilian Georgette, was mother of the 1952 Summer Olympics shooting sport participant Ingram Capper.
- William Stephen Dana (1861–1864), who died as a child.
- Anna Georgette Dana (1862–1932), who married Philippe Bérard (1856–1911), Chevalier of the Legion of Honor, in 1887.
- Robert Washington Dana (1868–1956), who was a naval architect who designed destroyers for the Admiralty and Royal Navy during World War I. He was also the assistant to John Wolfe Barry on the construction of Tower Bridge, and the Resident Engineer for reconstruction of Kew Bridge. Robert married Anna Kane, daughter of William H. Kane.

Bob Dana wrote a biographical pamphlet about his father's life and friendships with John Singer Sargent and Rex Whistler, two of the most significant American painters of the Post-impressionist period.

Dana died in London in 1927, a very rich man with a large family, and a British subject. His daughter died within months of Dana, also in 1927, his wife having long predeceased him. After his death, all of his paintings were put on show in London's west end at the Gieves Art Gallery.
