= Wilson Noble =

British politician

Member of Parliament for Hastings
- In office 1886–1895
- Preceded by: Sir Thomas Brassey
- Succeeded by: William Lucas-Shadwell

Personal details
- Born: 21 November 1854 Bloomsbury, London, England
- Died: 1 November 1914 (aged 59)
- Party: Conservative
- Spouse: Marian Caroline Dana (m. 1879)
- Children: 4

Wilson Noble (21 November 1854 – 1 November 1917) was a barrister and Conservative Party politician in England who served from 1886 to 1895 as Member of Parliament (MP) for Hastings in East Sussex.

== Early life ==
Noble was born 21 November 1854 in Bloomsbury, a district in the West End of London. He was the son of the son of John Noble, Landowner, and his wife Lily.

== Career ==
From 1886 to 1895, Noble served as a Conservative Member of Parliamentfor Hastings in East Sussex.

He unsuccessfully contested the Hastings constituency at the 1885 general election, losing narrowly to the sitting Liberal MP Sir Thomas Brassey; however, at the 1886 general election Brassey stood down from the House of Commons and was elevated to the peerage as Baron Brassey of Bulkeley. Noble won the seat, and was re-elected in 1892. He retired from the Commons at the 1895 general election.

== Personal life ==
In 1879, Noble was married to Marian Caroline Dana (1857–1927), in Paris, France, where Marian was born. She was a daughter of William Parsons Winchester Dana, an American born artist who became a naturalised British citizen. Through her mother, Marian was also the granddaughter of businessman James Boyles Murray, a descendant of Sir James Murray, Lord Philiphaugh, the Lord Clerk Register of Scotland. In 1901, Noble was living at Tangley Park in Worplesdon with his wife, four daughters, a niece, and ten servants. In London, they resided at 52 Sloane St. Together, they were the parents of:

- Lilian Georgette Noble (b. 1881), who married Captain Robert Harcourt Ord Capper, Prince of Wales's North Staffordshire Regiment, of The Northgate, Herefordshire, and was mother of the 1952 Summer Olympics shooting sport participant Ingram Capper.
- Marian Murray Noble (b. 1883)
- Evelyn Violet Noble (b. 1886)
- Nadine Frances Noble (1891–1983), who married Guy William Lambert, the son of Joseph Alexander Lambert, the High Sheriff of Mayo. Guy was the Assistant Under-Secretary of State for War between 1938 and 1951.

At the time of his death, he lived at Park Place, near Remenham in Berkshire. Noble died on 1 November 1917.

Parliament of the United Kingdom
Preceded by Sir Thomas Brassey	Member of Parliament for Hastings; 1886 – 1895	Succeeded by William Lucas-Shadwell
