= Oliver Bronson =

American physician (1799–1875)

- Born: October 3, 1799; Middlebury, Connecticut, U.S.
- Died: June 21, 1875 (aged 75); Richfield Springs, New York, U.S.
- Education: Yale University; College of Physicians and Surgeons
- Occupation: Physician
- Spouse: Joanna Donaldson (m. 1833–1875)
- Parent(s): Isaac Bronson; Anna Olcott Bronson
- Relatives: Frederic Bronson (nephew)

Oliver Bronson (October 3, 1799 – June 21, 1875) was an American physician and educator who was "heir to a wealthy Connecticut financier, banker, and real estate speculator."

== Early life ==
Bronson was born on October 3, 1799, at Breakneck in Middlebury, Connecticut, and was named after his parents' first son who died in infancy. He was eldest surviving son of ten children born to Anna (née Olcott) Bronson (1765–1850), and Isaac Bronson (1760–1838), a surgeon during the American Revolutionary War who was a successful banker and land speculator credited with co-founding the New York Life Insurance and Trust Company and Ohio Life Insurance and Trust Company. Among his siblings was sister Maria Bronson (who married Col. James Boyles Murray) and Frederic Bronson Sr. (who married Charlotte Brinckerhoff, a granddaughter and heir of Robert Troup).

His maternal grandfather was Thomas Olcott and his paternal grandparents were Captain Isaac Bronson and Mary Bronson. Through his brother Frederic, he was an uncle of prominent lawyer Frederic Bronson, who married Sarah Gracie King (a granddaughter of James Gore King and William Alexander Duer).

Bronson attended Yale University and graduated from the College of Physicians and Surgeons, later a part of Columbia University, in 1818.

== Career ==
His father used his insurance companies to finance the purchase of nearly a third of a million acres in multiple states. Oliver and his younger brothers Arthur and Frederic aided their father in the land speculation business. From 1851 to 1854, Oliver was the first superintendent of schools in Hudson, New York, and was also a shareholder in the Hudson Gas Company.

Bronson was described by Isabel Donaldson Bronson as "a cultivated, intelligent man, well-educated in his profession both in America & in Paris. His very delicate health obliged him to early give up active practice, but to the end of his kind and charitable life he ministered to the poor and lonely. He was a most excellent physician and a most excellent man... He was a serious man, taking a stern view of life in accordance with his strict Presbyterian belief."

In November 1868, during Reconstruction following the end of the U.S. Civil War, Bronson was appointed the first superintendent of the new St. Johns County School System in St. Johns County, Florida and by March 1869, the school board was appointed. Before the Civil War, Bronson had contact with Buckingham Smith and Sarah Mather, who may have been the instigators of bringing Bronson to St. Johns. In Florida, they bought a house (later Saint George's Hotel) and lived in St. Augustine, Florida

=== Residence ===
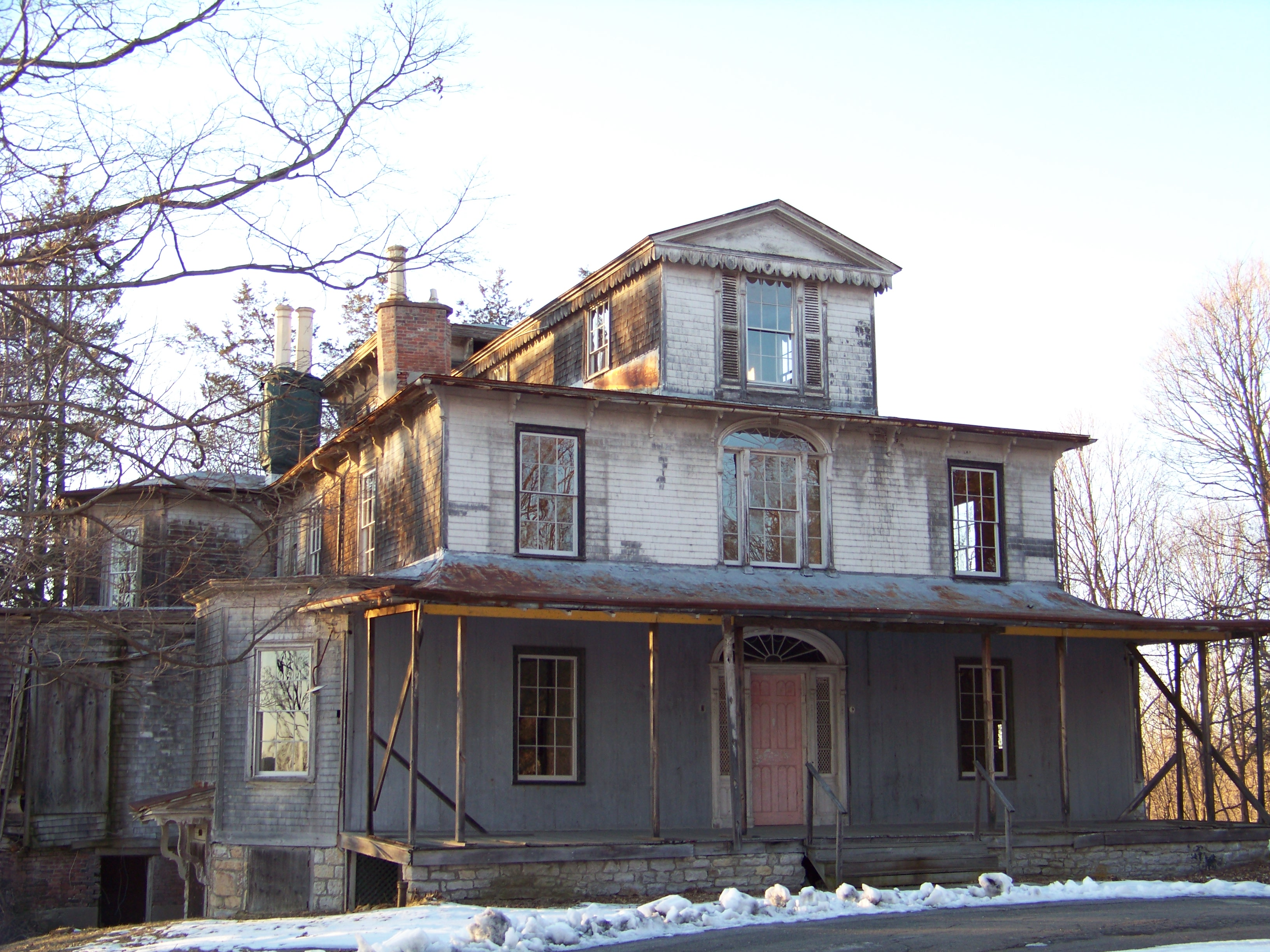
The Oliver Bronson House, 2009.

In 1838, Bronson purchased the former home and estate of Samuel Plumb in Hudson, New York, from Robert Frary. He hired architect Alexander Jackson Davis to updated and expand the Federal-style villa that was built on a bluff overlooking the Hudson River's South bay, and Andrew Jackson Downing to do the landscaping and gardens. The house, completed in 1849, is an early example of the Hudson River Bracketed style and features a three-story bracket tower, semi-octagonal rooms, bays and an ornamental veranda. In 1849, Bronson acquired an additional 29 acres (12 ha) south of his original purchase, reuniting the original estate land that was excluded in his first purchase, bringing the estate up to 50 acres (20 ha). Bronson later sold the house in 1853 to Frederick Fitch Folger, and returned to Connecticut.

The house and surrounding landscape had been painted by William Guy Wall in 1819, and today the watercolor is in the possession of the New-York Historical Society. Portions of the property became the site of the New York Training School for Girls, established in the 1860s at a site southwest of the estate, with the Bronson House serving as the residence of the school's director until c. 1970. The house was declared a National Historic Landmark in 2003.

== Personal life ==
On May 15, 1833, Bronson was married to Joanna Donaldson (1806–1876) at the Murray Street Presbyterian Church in New York. Joanna, who was born in North Carolina, was the daughter of Sarah (née Henderson) Donaldson and Robert Donaldson Sr., a Scottish born merchant, and the younger sister of Robert Donaldson Jr., a prominent banker and patron of the arts. Together, they were the parents of:

- Isaac Bronson (1835–1872), a lawyer who married Harriet Whitney Phoenix (1835–1864), daughter of U.S. Representative Jonas P. Phoenix and granddaughter of Stephen Whitney, at St. Paul's Chapel in New York on March 1, 1859. Harriet died of diphtheria in Baden-Baden, Germany, five years after their marriage, during the Civil War. After her death, he married Alice Whetten, with whom he had a daughter, Julia Ethel Bronson (1870–1924), who married in Rome, Italy, on 16 May 1903, Prince Giambattista Rospigliosi.
- Oliver Bronson (1837–1918), a graduate of Williams College and Harvard Law School who married Julia Frances Colt (1844–1921) at Trinity Church on June 2, 1870. He was a St. Johns County Commissioner during Reconstruction.
- Willett Bronson (1840–1917), who married Margaret O'Farrell (1846–1903) on November 16, 1871. He was a lawyer and real estate investor who eventually went bankrupt by 1883 after buying up-town lots and having houses built on them in New York.
- Robert Donaldson Bronson (1845–1912), who married his cousin Isabel Donaldson (1846–1931).

The painting was later acquired by Richard Jenrette and displayed at his residence in the Hudson Valley, Edgewater in Barrytown, New York.

Bronson died on June 21, 1875, in Richfield Springs in Otsego County, New York. After a funeral at the Church of the Strangers, a church for Southerners in New York, he was buried at Green-Wood Cemetery in Brooklyn. Less than a year after his death, his widow died on February 13, 1876, in Baltimore, Maryland.

=== Descendants ===
Through his son Oliver, he was a grandfather, and namesake, of Oliver Bronson (1871–1874), who died young, and Francis Philip Bronson (1876–1918).
