= Ingram Capper =

British sports shooter (1907–1986)

Personal information
- Born: 17 November 1907 Ross-on-Wye, Herefordshire, England
- Died: 12 July 1986 (aged 78) Colchester, Essex, England

Sport
- Sport: Sports shooting

Ingram Ord Capper (17 November 1907 − 12 July 1986) was a British sports shooter. He competed in the 100 m running deer event at the 1952 Summer Olympics.

== Early life ==
Capper was the elder son (there being also two daughters) of Captain Robert Harcourt Ord Capper, Prince of Wales's North Staffordshire Regiment, of The Northgate, Herefordshire, by his wife Lilian Georgette, eldest daughter of Conservative politician Wilson Noble, of Park Place, Henley-on-Thames, Berkshire. Lilian Capper was a granddaughter of the American painter William Parsons Winchester Dana. The Capper family, mainly lawyers and clergymen, were landed gentry, of Lyston Court, Ross, Herefordshire. He was noted, as a member of the Bromyard and District Local History Society, to be a descendant of Christopher Capper, of Bromyard, Herefordshire, bailiff of that place, a grazier, and owner of the White Horse Inn on Cruxwell Street.

== Career ==
A stockbroker, Capper served as a Lieutenant in the Royal Navy Volunteer Reserve during World War II.

== Later life ==
Capper lived at Polstead, Suffolk. His daughter, Romayne (1936–1985), married into the family of the Earls of Bradford. His younger brother, Neston Dana Ord Capper (born 1911), of Lower Hope, Ullingswick, was High Sheriff of Herefordshire in 1971.
