= Villiers Hatton =

British Army general

Major-General Villiers Hatton CB
- Born: 8 October 1852; Clonard, County Wexford
- Died: 18 June 1914 (aged 61)
- Spouse: Emily Burrall Hoffman (m. 1897)
- Military career
- Allegiance: United Kingdom
- Branch: British Army
- Rank: Major-General
- Commands: 1st Bn Grenadier Guards; Commander of British Troops in South China
- Conflicts: Mahdist War
- Awards: Companion of the Order of the Bath

Major-General Villiers Hatton CB (8 October 1852 – 18 June 1914) was Commander of British Troops in South China.

== Early life ==
Hatton was born on 8 October 1852. He was the son of Lieutenant-colonel Villiers La Touche Hatton (1824–1897) and Rosia Mary de Bathe (d. 1895). His father served as High Sheriff of Wexford from 1862 to 1863. His siblings were Rosia Mary Hatton, Madeline Frances Hatton (d. 1926), who married Maj.-Gen. Sir Henry Mackinnon (1852–1929), and William De Bathe Hatton (b. 1855).

His paternal grandparents were Vice-admiral Villiers Francis Hatton and Henrietta La Touche (d. 1866). His grandfather was the son of George Hatton and Lady Isabella Seymour-Conway (1755–1825), herself the daughter of Francis Seymour-Conway, 1st Marquess of Hertford and Lady Isabella Fitzroy, a daughter of Charles FitzRoy, 2nd Duke of Grafton.

== Career ==
Hatton was commissioned into the Grenadier Guards in 1870. He was made instructor of musketry in 1874 and adjutant of his regiment in 1884.

He was appointed commanding officer of 1st Bn Grenadier Guards and in that capacity, having landed at Dakhla on 6 August 1898, took part in the Nile Expedition during the Mahdist War and was mentioned in despatches. His period of service as commanding officer ended in January 1900, when he was placed on half-pay.

He became commander of British Troops in South China in 1903. He retired in 1909 to Berkeley Square in London.

== Personal life ==
In 1897, he married Emily Burrall Hoffman (1861–1942). Emily, an American, was the daughter of Harriet Bronson Willett (1839–1911) (granddaughter of Dr. Isaac Bronson) and Charles Burrall Hoffman (1821–1892), the son of U.S. Representative Ogden Hoffman and brother of Ogden Hoffman, Jr., a U.S. federal judge, in 1860.

Military offices
Preceded by Sir William Gascoigne	Commander of British Troops in South China; 1903–1906	Succeeded by Robert Broadwood
