= William Lucas-Shadwell =

British politician (1852–1915)

Lucas-Shadwell in 1895

William Lucas-Shadwell (14 August 1852 – 31 May 1915) was a Conservative Party politician in England.

He unsuccessfully contested the Finsbury East constituency at the 1892 general election, but at the 1895 general election he was elected as member of parliament (MP) for Hastings. He did not contest the 1900 general election.

Parliament of the United Kingdom
Preceded by Wilson Noble	Member of Parliament for Hastings; 1895 – 1900	Succeeded by Freeman Freeman-Thomas
