= Isaac Bronson =

American surgeon

- Portrait of Bronson by John Trumbull
- Born: March 10, 1760; Middlebury, Connecticut, U.S.
- Died: May 19, 1838 (aged 78); Greenfield Hill, Connecticut, U.S.
- Occupations: Surgeon, investor, banker
- Spouse: Anna Olcott (m. 1789–1838)
- Children: 10
- Parent(s): Isaac Bronson; Mary Bronson
- Relatives: Frederic Bronson (grandson)

Dr. Isaac Bronson (March 10, 1760 in Middlebury, CT – May 19, 1838 in Greenfield Hill) was a surgeon during the American Revolutionary War. He was later a successful banker and land speculator and is credited with co-founding the New York Life Insurance and Trust Company and Ohio Life Insurance and Trust Company. Bronson was a member of the Society of the Cincinnati.

== Early life ==
Bronson was born on March 10, 1760, in Middlebury, Connecticut. He was the son of Captain Isaac Bronson (1736–1826) and Mary Bronson (d. 1810), and the older brother of Ethel Bronson (1765–1825), who married Hepzibah Hopkins Bronson (1768–1829) and Silas Bronson (1788-1867). His father was a farmer who was also a member of the Connecticut General Assembly.

His paternal grandparents were Isaac Bronson (1707–1799) and Eunice (nee Richards) Bronson (1716–1749).

== Career ==
Bronson studied medicine with Dr. Lemuel Hopkins in Litchfield. On November 14, 1779, he received a warrant to become a junior surgeon at the age of 19. During the American Revolutionary War, he served in the 2nd Regiment of Light Dragoons under George Washington, eventually becoming senior surgeon (attaining the rank of colonel) until the War ended in 1783. Bronson made a personal appeal to George Washington to have his mates treated fairly and awarded pensions like the other officers. Three decades later, the omission was finally addressed and surgeons were granted full pay for life.

=== Later career ===
After the War, Isaac Bronson became interested in foreign commerce and traveled as far as China, returning with valuable cargo which he sold at a profit. Bronson then pursued a career in purchasing and selling government obligations. He invested in the new American government's debt, assisted by many friends from former officers, including Alexander Hamilton, who had become the first Secretary of the Treasury in Washington's first cabinet. in some cases purchasing it for ten cents on the dollar. When the debt recovered to its face value, he had made a fortune. Bronson also invested in the Bank of the United States.

In 1807, he founded the Bridgeport Bank in Connecticut, for which he was the largest shareholder, a director and president from 1807 to 1832. In 1830, he co-founded the New York Life Insurance and Trust Company (which merged with the Bank of New York in 1922) and Ohio Life Insurance and Trust Company.

By 1828, he was one of the wealthiest men in New York City, with assets of more than $250,000. Bronson also owned and invested in considerable real estate holdings throughout New York.

None did more than banker Isaac Bronson to make an exact science of the business. Going beyond mere speculation, Bronson employed local businessmen, judges, and politicians to steer him toward the best land. He then resold it to farmers, granting five-year mortgages at 6 percent to those whose financial standing his agents and scrutinized and certified. By the early 1820s Bronson owned or held mortgages on property in over half the counties of the state. His enterprise was so solid that conservative bankers like Prime, Ward & King invested substantial sums with him.

In 1833, Bronson, along with his sons Arthur, Frederic, and Charles Butler, the brother of Benjamin Franklin Butler the U.S. Attorney General, used his vast wealth to make one of the largest land purchases of his day. Utilizing capital from the New York Life Insurance and Trust Company, among other banks, they purchased nearly one-third of a million acres of land across eight states, including North Carolina, Indiana, Chicago (which had a population of only 500 at the time) and other parts of Illinois, Wisconsin, and the Michigan Territory Bronson was competing against John Jacob Astor, who also acquired a vast real estate portfolio.

== Personal life ==
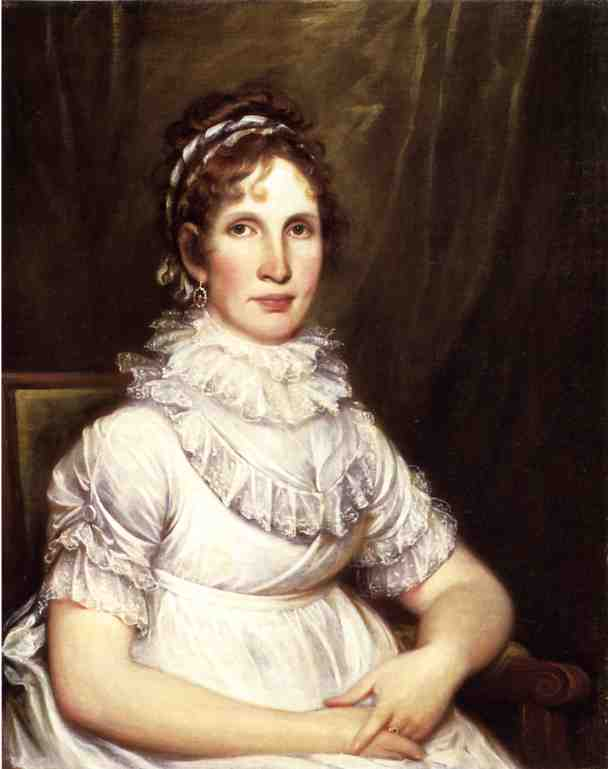
Portrait of Mrs. Isaac Bronson, circa 1805, by John Trumbull

On August 30, 1789, three months after his last trip to China, he married Anna Olcott (1765–1850), the daughter of Thomas Olcott. They moved to Hartford, then Philadelphia, and eventually in New York City. Together, they had ten children, two of whom died in infancy. Their children included:

- Oliver Bronson, who died in infancy
- Maria Bronson, who also died in infancy
- Maria Bronson (1793–1851), who married Col. James Boyles Murray (1789–1866), the son of wealthy English born merchant John Murray and grandson of Sir James Murray, Lord Philiphaugh.
- Harriet Bronson (1798–1886)
- Caroline Bronson (1798–1853), who married Dr. Marinus Willett (1801–1840), son of Marinus Willett
- Oliver Bronson (1799–1875), also a doctor who married Joanna Donaldson (1806–1876) in 1833.
- Arthur Bronson (1801–1844), who married Ann Eliza Bailey (d. 1878), a daughter of Theodorus Bailey, a United States Senator from New York.
- Frederic Bronson Sr. (1802–1868), who married Charlotte Brinckerhoff (1818–1861), a granddaughter and heir of Robert Troup, in 1838.
- Mary Bronson (b. 1806)
- Ann Bronson (b. 1810)

Bronson died on May 19, 1838, at Greenfield Hill.

=== Residence ===
In 1796, Bronson purchased the home of Timothy Dwight, called "Verna" in Greenfield Hill. Their country home later became Fairfield Country Day School. He is credited with planting the first dogwood trees along Bronson Road where today there is a yearly Dogwood Festival.

=== Descendants ===
Through his daughter Caroline, he was the grandfather of Harriet Bronson Willett (1839–1911), who married Charles Burrall Hoffman (1821–1892), the son of Ogden Hoffman and brother of Ogden Hoffman, Jr., in 1860. Their daughter, Emily Burrall Hoffman (1861–1942), married Maj. Gen. Villiers Hatton, CB (1852–1914), the Commander of British Troops in South China, in 1897.

Through his son Frederic, he was the grandfather of Frederic Bronson (1851–1900), who married Sarah Gracie King (1850–1931). She was the daughter of Archibald Gracie King and Elizabeth Denning (née Duer) King, and the granddaughter of U.S. Representative James Gore King and William Alexander Duer. She was also the sister of May Denning King, who married John King Van Rensselaer, son of Henry Bell Van Rensselaer and grandson of Stephen Van Rensselaer III, the patroon of Rensselaerwyck.
