= James Boyles Murray =

- Born: November 6, 1789; Alexandria, Virginia, U.S.
- Died: February 14, 1866 (aged 76); New York City, New York, U.S.
- Political party: Democratic-Republican
- Spouse: Maria Bronson (after 1814)
- Children: 8
- Parent(s): John Boyles Murray; Martha McClenahan
- Relatives: Sir James Murray (grandfather); Isaac Bronson (father-in-law)

James Boyles Murray (November 6, 1789 – February 14, 1866) was an American businessman and leading member of New York society in the early-to-mid-19th century.

== Early life ==
Murray was born to a wealthy immigrant family in Alexandria, Virginia on November 6, 1789. He was the son of Martha (née McClenahan) Murray and Dr. John Boyles Murray, who moved to Virginia in 1760.

Murray's paternal grandfather was Sir James Murray, Lord Philiphaugh. His Presbyterian lineage was descended from the royal Stewarts through the ubiquitous clan of Murray. His mother's family, that of Martha McClenahan, had been associated with the history of the Siege of Derry. Rev. McClenahan had been one of the Apprentice Boys supporters, when they marched out to meet King James army.

In 1800, Murray went to Norfolk, England, and caught a glimpse of the hero Admiral Nelson touring through his home city of Norwich. As a small boy, he had been warned of his Scots ancestry. He toured Philiphaugh, Scotland. He never forgot the supremacy of the seas of the Royal Navy, and vowed to help the President build a strong US Navy.

== Career ==
Murray was an early entrant in the New York Militia, replacing his gun-shy uncle in the War of 1812. Through his revolutionary connections he rose quickly to become a Colonel.

He joined in partnership with the financier Isaac Bronson, one of the founders of sound credit in public finance. He borrowed heavily to finance the construction of the Erie Canal. The Erie Canal was partly funded by the Bronson family bankers.

In politics, Murray was a friend of the Democratic-Republicans of the Albany Regency. Their leading character, De Witt Clinton, had been involved in scandal. Martin Van Buren, his successor, was less scandal-prone. In 1816 Murray joined the staff of vice-president candidate Daniel Tompkins, the Governor. Murray's role was to act as bodyguard and protector of the V-P. Then one day on the Chesapeake half of President Tyler's cabinet was killed by the explosion of a gun on the USS Princeton, leading to the end of Murray's political ambitions.

After the USS Princeton explosion, Murray pivoted to focus on land speculations and construction projects. He continued to do business with the Bronson sons. Murray became involved in the Rutherford Land Grab of 1834 in the Carolinas, but was not convicted. He was also in a partnership that invested extensively in the 'Ohio Country' as far west as Chicago and Kalamazoo.

In later life, Murray made extensive business trips to France and England, being particularly pleased with Paris where his daughter married the American Impressionist painter, William Dana. Murray went on tour to Scotland and visited the high society circles of London. His public appearances attracted fees. Murray deplored the outbreak of the Civil War in 1861, the duration of which he spent in New York City.

== Personal life ==
In 1814, Murray married Maria Bronson (1793–1851), the eldest surviving daughter of Isaac Bronson (1760–1838), founder of New York Assurance Company and Bridgeport Bank at Park Place in New York City, and sister of Oliver Bronson. In 1828, Bronson was the richest man in New York. Murray was at the height of New York society and purchased a house at the fashionable Manhattan address of Washington Square Park. Together, they were the parents of eight children, including:

- Maria Murray (1815–1884), who married at Greenfield Hill, Connecticut, in 1846.
- Bronson Murray (1816–1911), who married Ann Eliza Peyton (b. 1821) in 1848.
- John Boyles Murray (1818–1889), who married Sarah Elizabeth Craft (1823–1869) in 1843. After her death, he married Felicia May Leiss, the daughter of Dr. Frederic Leiss.
- Caroline Murray (1820–1889), who died unmarried.
- Agnes Augusta Murray (1827–1878)
- Washington Murray (1828–1867), a Yale and Harvard Law School graduate who married Eliza Bradlee Winchester Dana (b. 1835), sister of William Dana in 1856.
- Anna Bronson Murray (1831–1915), who married William Parsons Winchester Dana (1833–1927) in 1855.

Murray died in 1866 at 4 Washington Place, New York City. His family was later related to William Cutting (of Bayard Cutting Arboretum in Great River, NY). Some of Murray's correspondence is held by the New-York Historical Society.
