= Ohio Life Insurance and Trust Company =

American banking institution

The Ohio Life Insurance and Trust Company was a banking institution based in Cincinnati, Ohio, which existed from 1830 to 1857. The Panic of 1857, an economic depression, resulted after the company's New York City offices ceased operations due to bad investments, especially in agriculture-related businesses. During the Crimean War (1853–1856), much of Europe's farm labor was engaged in the military, resulting in Europe becoming dependent on American crops for food. At the conclusion of the war, European farm production resumed and American agricultural exports declined, causing a drop in value of American foodstuffs. Because of the telegraph, word of the office closure spread quickly and many investors, already shaky over declining markets, caused a financial panic. The markets would not recover until two years later.

Due to the economic decline from failure of the Ohio Life Insurance and Trust Company, the railroad industry and many businesses experienced declining demand for their products. Railroad workers were laid off and many businesses were shut down.

Embezzlement by employees and officers of the company is sometimes mentioned as another contributing cause of the office's closure.
