= Iselin =

Iselin may refer to:

== People with the family name ==
- Iselin family, a Swiss bourgeois family
- Adrian G Iselin (1818–1905), American banker, businessman & millionaire
- Charles Oliver Iselin (1854–1932), American banker and yachtsman
- Columbus O'Donnell Iselin (1904–1971), American oceanographer
- Hope Goddard Iselin (1868–1970), American heiress and sportswoman
- Reinhard Iselin (1714–1781), Swiss-Danish baron, merchant and landowner
- Isaak Iselin (1728–1782), Swiss philosopher of history and politics
- John Jay Iselin (1933–2008), American philanthropist
- Philip H. Iselin (1902–1976), American businessman

== People with the given name ==
Female

- Iselin Alme (born 1957), Norwegian singer and stage actress
- Iselin Michelsen (born 1990), Norwegian glamour model and singer
- Iselin Nybø (born 1981), Norwegian politician
- Iselin Solheim (born 1990), Norwegian singer-songwriter
- Iselin Steiro (born 1985), Norwegian model

Male

- Iselín Santos Ovejero (born 1945), Argentinian football player

== Places ==
- Iselin, New Jersey, census-designated place, United States
- Iselin, Pennsylvania, unincorporated community, United States
- Iselin Bank, a bank in the Ross Sea off the coast of Antarctica
- Iselin Seamount, a seamount off the coast of Antarctica
