= Adrian Iselin Jr. =

American banker (1846–1935)

Adrian Georg Iselin Jr.
- Born: October 14, 1846; New York City, U.S.
- Died: January 29, 1935 (aged 88); New York City, U.S.
- Resting place: Woodlawn Cemetery
- Occupation: Banker
- Spouses: Louise Caylus (m. 1872; died 1909) Sarah Gracie King Bronson (m. 1914; died 1931)
- Parent(s): Adrian Georg Iselin; Eleanora O'Donnell Iselin
- Relatives: C. Oliver Iselin (brother); Columbus O'Donnell (grandfather)

Adrian Georg Iselin Jr. (October 14, 1846 – January 29, 1935) was an American banker.

== Early life ==
Iselin was born on October 14, 1846, in New York City. He was the eldest of seven children born to Adrian Georg Iselin (1818–1905) and Eleanora (née O'Donnell) Iselin (1821–1897). His younger siblings included William Emil Iselin; Eleanora Iselin (wife of DeLancey Astor Kane); Columbus O'Donnell Iselin (husband of Edith Colford Jones); Charles Oliver Iselin; Georgine Iselin, who was made a Papal Countess in 1912 and did not marry; Emilie Eleanora Iselin (wife of John George Beresford, a grandson of Henry Beresford, 2nd Marquess of Waterford). in 1898.

"From his boyhood, Adrian had accompanied his father on his travels throughout the various mining towns, and later made such journeys alone or joined by his wife and children."

== Career ==
Beginning in 1868, he was engaged in the banking business founded by his father, with Adrian Jr. later serving as the senior member of the investment banking firm of A. Iselin & Co., which was located at 40 Wall Street. He also served as president and a director of the Iselin Corporation, the City and Suburban Homes Co., the Astor Trust Company, among others. He controlled the Rochester and Pittsburgh Coal and Iron Company, which established Adrian Mines and Yatesboro, Pennsylvania.

Iselin owned a significant number of shares of the New York Dock Company, which he sold to Gregori Benenson in 1923. "Two years previously he formed the protective committee representing holders of first and second preferred shares in a proposed plan of reorganization of the Reading Company" and formerly was a director of the Southern Railway and was a member of the finance committee of the Chamber of Commerce of the State of New York.

=== Philanthropy ===
In October 1914, Iselin presented the Indiana County's General Hospital to the people of Indiana in memory of his first wife, Louise Caylus Iselin, who died in 1909.

== Personal life ==
On April 4, 1872, Iselin was married to Louise Caylus (1848–1909). Louisa and Adrian lived in New York City and maintained a residence at Davenport Neck, a peninsula in New Rochelle, and together were the parents of:

- Adrian Iselin III (1872–1885), who died aged 12.
- Ernest Iselin (1876–1954), who married Pauline Whittier (1876–1946), a daughter of Charles A. Whittier, in 1904.
- Therese Eleanor Iselin (1880–1958), who married Irwin Boyle Laughlin (1871–1941), the United States Ambassador to Greece and Spain.
- Louise Marie Iselin (1888–1962), who died unmarried in France in 1962.

After Louise's death on December 4, 1909, he remarried to Sarah Gracie King Bronson (1850–1931) at St. Patrick's Cathedral on February 18, 1914. Sarah, the widow of Frederic Bronson, was the daughter of Archibald Gracie King and Elizabeth Denning (née Duer) King, and the granddaughter of U.S. Representative James Gore King and William Alexander Duer. She was also the sister of May Denning King, who married John King Van Rensselaer, son of Henry Bell Van Rensselaer and grandson of Stephen Van Rensselaer III, the patroon of Rensselaerwyck. From her first marriage, Sarah was the mother of Elizabeth Duer Bronson, who was married to Lloyd Carpenter Griscom, the United States Ambassador to Italy, before her death in 1914.

Iselin was a trustee of the Metropolitan Museum of Art and a member of the Order of the Knights of Malta, the Downtown Association, the Luncheon Club of Wall Street, the Knickerbocker Club, the Metropolitan Club, the Union Club, the Piping Rock Club, the Turf and Field Club, the Riding Club, the New York Yacht Club, the Larchmont Yacht Club, the New Rochelle Yacht Club, and the Genesee Valley Club of Rochester.

His widow died in her sleep on 1931. Iselin died on January 29, 1935, at his home, 820 Park Avenue in New York City. After a funeral at St. Patrick's Cathedral, he was buried at Woodlawn Cemetery in the Bronx.
