= Columbus Iselin =

American financier and philanthropist

- Born: Columbus O'Donnell Iselin; September 26, 1851; New York City, New York, U.S.
- Died: November 10, 1933 (aged 82); New Rochelle, New York, U.S.
- Resting place: Woodlawn Cemetery
- Spouse: Edith Colford Jones (died 1930)
- Parent(s): Adrian Georg Iselin; Eleanora O'Donnell
- Relatives: Charles Oliver Iselin (brother); Columbus O'Donnell Iselin (grandson)

Columbus O'Donnell Iselin (September 26, 1851 – November 11, 1933) was an American financier and philanthropist who was prominent in New York Society during the Gilded Age.

== Early life ==
Iselin was born in New York City on September 26, 1851. He was fourth of seven children born to Adrian Georg Iselin (1818–1905) and Eleanora (née O'Donnell) Iselin (1821–1897). His siblings were Adrian Iselin Jr., who married Louise Caylus, and Sarah Gracie King Bronson, the widow of Frederic Bronson; William Emil Iselin, who married Alice Rogers Jones; Eleanora Iselin, who married DeLancey Astor Kane, brother of Woodbury Kane and great-grandson of John Jacob Astor; Charles Oliver Iselin, who married Fannie Garner, and later, Edith Hope Goddard; Georgine Iselin, a Papal Countess who did not marry; and Emilie Eleanora Iselin, who married John George Beresford, a cousin of Lord Charles Beresford and grandson of Henry Beresford, 2nd Marquess of Waterford. in 1898.

His paternal grandparents were Isaac Iselin, who was born in Basel, Switzerland, and emigrated to the United States in 1801, and Aimee Jeanne (née Roulet) Iselin. In Switzerland, the Iselin family had been merchants, public officials, and military and professional men since the 14th century. His maternal grandparents were General Columbus O'Donnell, who was connected with the Baltimore & Ohio Railroad, and his wife Eleanora (née Pascault) O'Donnell of Baltimore, Maryland. His mother was related to John Carroll, the first Roman Catholic bishop in the United States and the founder of Georgetown University.

== Career ==
Iselin's father, a former dry goods merchant, founded the investment bank of A. Iselin and Co., located at 36 Wall Street, in 1854. Columbus continued his father's work at the firm following their father's retirement in 1878. After his father's death in 1905, he and his elder brother Adrian Iselin Jr. took control of the firm. His nephew, Ernest Iselin, was director of the company from 1929 to 1934 and chairman of the board from 1936 to 1954. The firm was in existence until 1936 when it was merged with Dominick & Dominick, an investment and merchant banking firm that exists to this day.

Iselin was a director of the New Rochelle Water Company, the New Rochelle Homestead Company, the New York Dock Company, a trustee of the New York Life and Insurance Company, a treasurer and director of the Allegheny and Western Railroad Company, the Buffalo, Rochester and Pittsburgh Railway, the Clearfield and Mahoning Railway Company, the Helvetia Realty Company, the Jefferson & Clearfield Coal & Iron Company, the Johnsonburg & Bradford Railroad Company, the Mahoning Valley Railroad Company, the Manhattan Storage & Warehouse Company, the Reynoldsville & Falls Creek Railroad Company. With his family, he owned a significant portion of the Rochester and Pittsburgh Coal and Iron Company, (Note: The Rochester and Pittsburgh Coal and Iron Company was a subsidiary of the Buffalo, Rochester and Pittsburgh Railway.) of which he began serving as president in 1885 and later as the secretary-treasurer.

=== Society life ===
In 1892, both Iselin and his wife Edith were included in Ward McAllister's "Four Hundred", purported to be an index of New York's best families, published in The New York Times. Conveniently, 400 was the number of people that could fit into Mrs. Astor's ballroom.

He was also a member of the Union Club, the Seawanhaka Corinthian Yacht Club, the Downtown Club, the University Club, the Knickerbocker Club, Metropolitan Club, the Country Club of New York, the Larchmont Yacht Club and the New York Yacht Club.

His father had purchased extensive property along Davenport Neck, the Long Island Sound shore community in New Rochelle where he built a country estate for himself, All View, and for Columbus and his siblings.

== Personal life ==
Iselin was married to Edith Colford Jones (1854–1930). In addition to their country estate in New Rochelle, the Iselin's lived at 3 West 52nd Street in Manhattan. Together, they were the parents of:

- Columbus O'Donnell Iselin (1877–1877), who died as an infant.
- Lewis Iselin (1879–1928), who married Marie de Neufville (1883–1979)
- O'Donnell Iselin (1884–1971), who married Margaret Urling Sibley (1893–1951) in 1919.

Iselin died at his estate in New Rochelle on November 11, 1933. His estate was left to his children and grandchildren. By 1937, his estate was valued at $4,833,550.

=== Descendants ===
Through his son Lewis, he was the grandfather of Columbus O'Donnell Iselin (1904-1971), the oceanographer who was the director of the Woods Hole Oceanographic Institution and a Professor of Physical Oceanography at Harvard University and the Massachusetts Institute of Technology.

Through his son O'Donnell, he was the grandfather of Peter Iselin (1920–2010), who was married to Margaretta Sargeant Large Duane (1928–2015), the daughter of Morris Duane (d. 1992), in 1952.
