= Aiken Winter Colony =

Colony in South Carolina

Coordinates: 33.5571°N 81.7219°W

The Aiken Winter Colony was a winter resort in Aiken, South Carolina, that existed in the 1800s as a health resort for coastal residents wishing to escape malaria and yellow fever.

== Formation and History ==
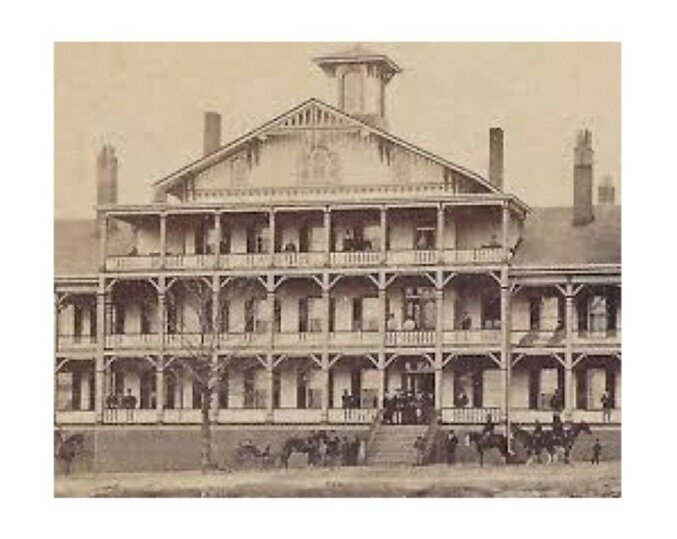
Highland Park Hotel (circa. 1890s)

The Aiken Winter Colony was established in Aiken, South Carolina, by Thomas Hitchcock Sr. and William C. Whitney in the late 19th century. The resort gathered fame as a wintering spot for wealthy families, mainly from the Northeastern United States. Activities that were popular at the resort included fox hunting, polo, golf, and equestrian sports.

The Winter Colony's estate consisted of many large houses, cottages, and six hotels. The Highland Park Hotel was one of six hotels, and it hosted over 350 rooms. All of the hotels have since burnt down, except for the Wilcox Inn, which still remains today.

== Notable residents ==
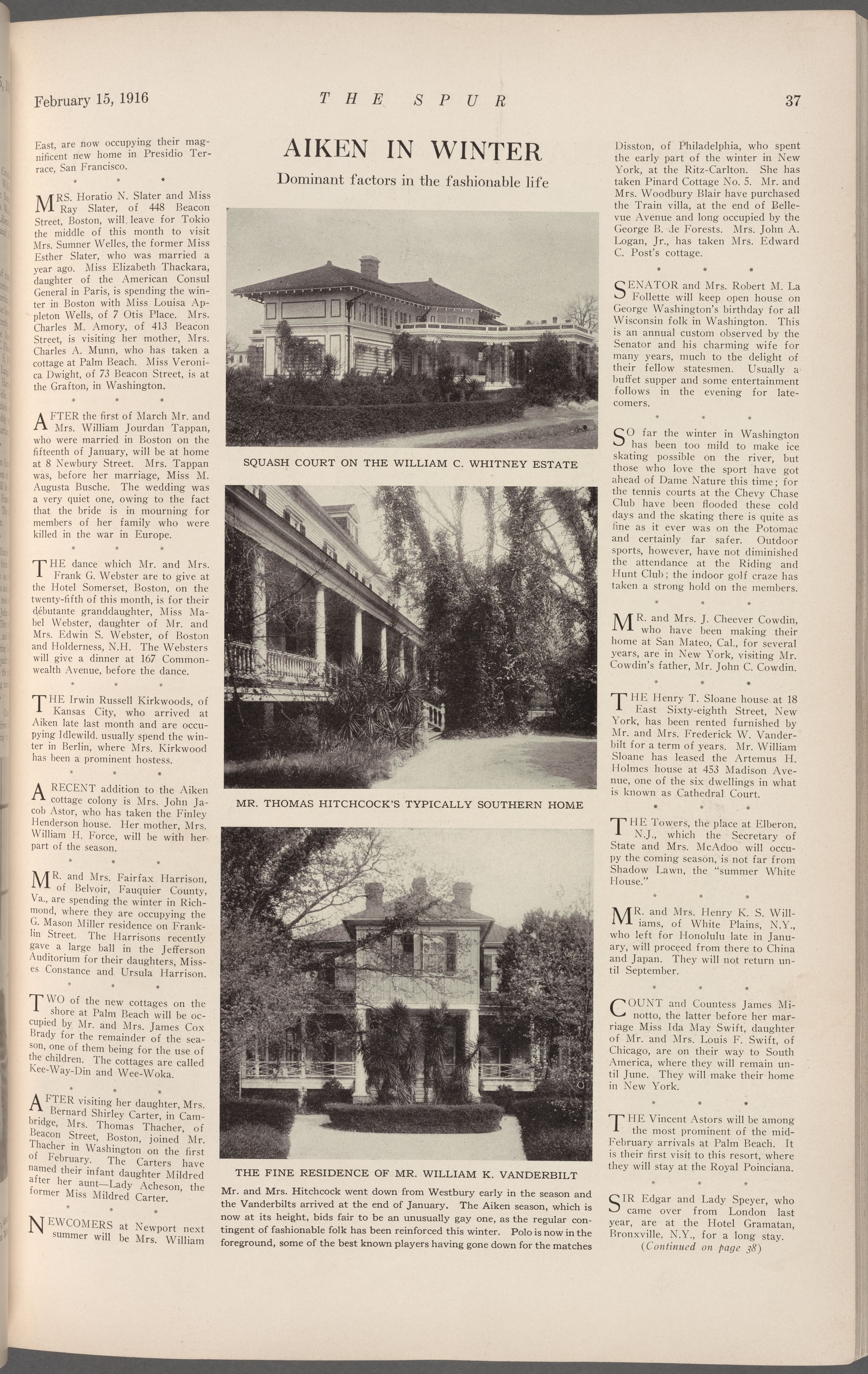
The residences of William C. Whitney, William K. Vanderbilt, and Thomas Hitchcock, Sr. in 1916.

- George H. Bostwick
- James B. Eustis
- Madeleine Astor
- William Kissam Vanderbilt
- Eugene Grace (president of Bethlehem Steel)
- Allan Pinkerton
- W. Averell Harriman
- Seymour H. Knox II and his sister Dorothy Knox Goodyear Rogers, heir to the Woolworth fortune.
- Devereux Milburn
- C. Oliver Iselin and his second wife, Hope Goddard Iselin.

== See also ==
- Aiken Winter Colony Historic District I
- Aiken Winter Colony Historic District II
- Aiken Winter Colony Historic District III
- Willcox's
