= Miville family =

Swiss noble family

The Miville family is a noble family originally from Savoy, which became bourgeois of Geneva in the 16th century and later of Basel. The family played significant roles in colonial trade, silk dyeing, military service abroad, and Basel's political and religious life over several centuries.

== Origins and early settlement ==
After fleeing Savoy due to religious persecution, the family acquired bourgeoisie of Geneva in 1569 with Jaques Miville. His son Jakob Miville obtained bourgeoisie of Basel in 1606. Jakob became a successful wholesale merchant dealing in colonial products, primarily supplying pharmacies, and amassed considerable wealth and reputation.

== Economic activities ==
Abraham Miville (1622-1661), son of Jakob and Maria Schwarz (1592-1667), established the family tradition in silk dyeing, founding a business in this flourishing industry that was primarily practiced by Protestant refugees. His son Achilles Miville (1653-1726), along with some descendants, continued this profession. The family also maintained strong connections to the apothecary trade and general commerce.

Abraham's brother Nikolaus Miville (1657-1735) became a surgeon-barber, a profession that several family members would later pursue. From the 17th century onward, the Miville family formed alliances with other prominent Basel families including the Fischer, Socin, Stähelin, and Iselin families, which facilitated male family members' access to influential political circles. Women of the family often worked alongside their husbands in similar professional fields, particularly in apothecaries, commerce, and sometimes crafts.

== Military service abroad ==
During the 17th and 18th centuries, like other Basel families, several Miville members engaged in foreign military service. The sources mention Isaak Miville, probably the second son of Jakob Miville and Maria Schwarz born in 1628, who commanded the slave fort of Cape Coast built in 1653 on the Gold Coast (Ghana) by the Swedish Africa Company. He entered Swedish service at a young age and was among the first Swiss involved in the transatlantic slave trade, though his exact activities and relations with Basel remain poorly documented.

Nikolaus Miville (1718-1791), initially a surgeon like his namesake father, pursued a military career and served as an officer in the service of Naples and Spain. Upon his return to Basel in 1745, he applied his acquired skills to benefit his native city, serving as major of the cantonal militia and founding a free company where Basel citizens trained for warfare. As city major, he reformed and modernized the Basel police force.

Leonhard Miville (1785-1830), brother of landscape painter Jakob Christoph Miville, was among the last family members to serve abroad, participating in Napoleon's Russian campaign as part of French troops during the Napoleonic Wars.

== Religious involvement ==
The family played a notable role in Basel's religious history. In the mid-18th century, surgeon Hans Ulrich Miville (1723-1759), supported by his wife Magdalena Strasser (1728-1757), emerged as a radical Pietist through his publications. He was imprisoned and expelled during the "separatist trials" but was later pardoned.

Other family members served as pastors in urban churches, including Johann Jakob Miville (1812-1897) at St. Peter's Church and Johann Friedrich Miville (1754-1820) at St. Elisabeth Church. The latter, as rector of the gymnasium, professor of theology, and member of Basel's education council, advocated for educational reform during the Helvetic Republic.

== Political involvement ==
From the 17th century, Miville family members held positions in municipal administration, in the Griffon society of Kleinbasel, and in the Safran and Gardeners' guilds. In 1772, city major Nikolaus Miville became the first family member to join Basel's Grand Council. He was followed in 1776 by merchant Johann Ulrich Miville (1749-1792), who ascended to the Small Council in 1786.

During the 19th and 20th centuries, family members continued to be elected to municipal political offices. Carl Miville and his son Carl Miville were both active in federal politics, serving in the National Council, with the younger Carl also serving in the Council of States.

== Bibliography ==
- Koelner, Paul: Die Safranzunft zu Basel und ihre Handwerke und Gewerbe, 1935.
- Almanach généalogique suisse, vol. 6, 1936, pp. 406-411.
- Wanner, Gustav Adolf: Die Basler Handels-Gesellschaft A.G., 1859-1959, 1959.
- Miville-Seiler, Carl: "Die Miville", in: Jahrbuch E.E. Zunft zu Gartnern Basel, 1996, pp. 20-23.
- Hebeisen, Erika: „Leidenschaftlich fromm". Die pietistische Bewegung in Basel 1750-1830, 2005.
- Ackermann, Hans Christoph; Herlach, Katja (ed.): Jakob Christoph Miville 1786-1836. Ein Basler Landschaftsmaler zwischen Rom und St. Petersburg, 2014 (exhibition catalogue).
