= Iselin family =

The Iselin family is a Swiss bourgeois family who originally belonged to the Daig. There were two distinct lines with the older line becoming extinct in 1540. The younger line which had no relation to the older line, settled in Basel in 1364, originally being from Rosenfeld in Württemberg, Germany, becoming citizens of Basel in 1403.

Throughout the centuries they held notable positions as academics, merchants, clergy and military officials. and through marriage into the Swiss nobility, they became part of the cities upper class (Daig). The 'younger' line of the family developed gradually and soon was spread into four distinct lineages (of which two became extinct in the 17th and 19th century. There are currently two surviving lines into the present.

In the 18th and 19th centuries, three international lines were established, notably in Müllheim, London and New York City. The American Branch was established by Isaac Iselin (1783–1841), a banker and merchant, who emigrated from Basel to New York, in 1801. His descendants became part of The Four Hundred during the Gilded Age. Iselin, New Jersey is named after Adrian Iselin, a son of Isaac.

== American branch ==
=== Descendants of Isaac (Isaak) Iselin ===
- Isaac (Isaak) Iselin (1783–1841) (m.) Aimee Roulet (1792–1873)
  - Marie Helene Iselin (1811–1891) (m.) Henry Barbey (1799–1870)
    - Henry Isaac Barbey (1832–1906)
    - Emilie Eugénie Barbey (1839–1912) (m.) Guillaume Edouard Fatio (1836–1908)
      - Henry Gustave Fatio (1863–1930) (m.) Renée Adrienne Lombard (1874–1949)
      - Guillaume Fatio (1865–1938) (m.) Marguerite Hélène Emilie Pictet (1870–)
        - Robert Fatio (1893–1974) (m.) Marguerite Marie Hélène Revilliod (1899–1981)
        - Renée Eléonore Fatio (1894–1976) (m.) Victor Edmond Robert Gautier (1891–1965)
        - Maurice Fatio (1897–1943) (m.) Eleanor Sawyer Chase (1903–1944)
          - Maurice Pierre Fatio (1930–1961) (m.) Maryann Friedrich (1930–2000)
        - Madeleine Adèle Fatio (1899–1990) (m.) Alfred M. Zoelly (1893–1971)
          - Pierre Charles Zoelly (1923–2003)
        - André Fatio (1903–1983) (m.) Yvette Charlotte Delessert (1908–2004)
      - Hélène Fatio (1867–1944) (m.) Henri de Morsier (1859–1924)
        - Simone de Morsier (1888–1933)
        - Eugène de Morsier (1889–1946)
        - Renée de Morsier (1892–1964) (m.) Léonard Wimble (1890–)
        - Jacques de Morsier (1895–1962) (m.) Raymonde Appert (1907–1992)
    - Fréderic William Barbey (1842–1914) (m.) Caroline Mathilde Boissier (1847–1918)
  - John Abraham Iselin (1816–1869) (m.) Margaret Tomes (1824–1878)
    - John Henry Iselin (1848–1895) (m.) Mary Gouverneur Satterlee (1852–1920)
    - Isaac Iselin II (1850–1906)
    - Emilie Iselin (1859–1939) (m.) MacDonald
    - Henry Sigismund Iselin (1859–1932)
  - Adrian Georg Iselin (1818–1905) (m.) Eleonora O'Donnell (1821–1897)
    - Adrian Georg Iselin Jr. (1846–1935), married firstly Louise Caylus, secondly Sarah Gracie King.
      - Adrian Iselin III (1872–1885)
      - Ernest Iselin (1876–1954) (m.) Pauline Whittier (1876–1946)
        - Ernest Iselin (1905–1968)
        - Louise Iselin (1906–1982), married firstly Augustus King Mills III, secondly Count Leonardo Mercati
      - Therese Iselin (1880–1958)
      - Louise Marie Iselin (1888–1962)
    - William Emil Iselin (1848–1937)
    - Eleanora Iselin (1849–1938)
    - Columbus O'Donnell Iselin (1851–1933)
    - Charles Oliver Iselin (1854–1932)
    - Georgine Iselin (1857–1954), papal countess died unmarried.
    - Emilie Iselin (1860–1916)
