= Judge Pendleton =

Judge Pendleton may refer to:

- Edmund Pendleton (1721–1803), Virginia state court judge serving at various levels of the judiciary
- Francis Key Pendleton (1850–1930), judge of the Supreme Court of New York (the state's trial court)
- Nathaniel Pendleton (1756–1821), judge of the United States District Court for the District of Georgia
- Philip C. Pendleton (1779–1863), judge of the United States District Court for the Western District of Virginia
