= Peter Marié =

American socialite, philanthropist and collector

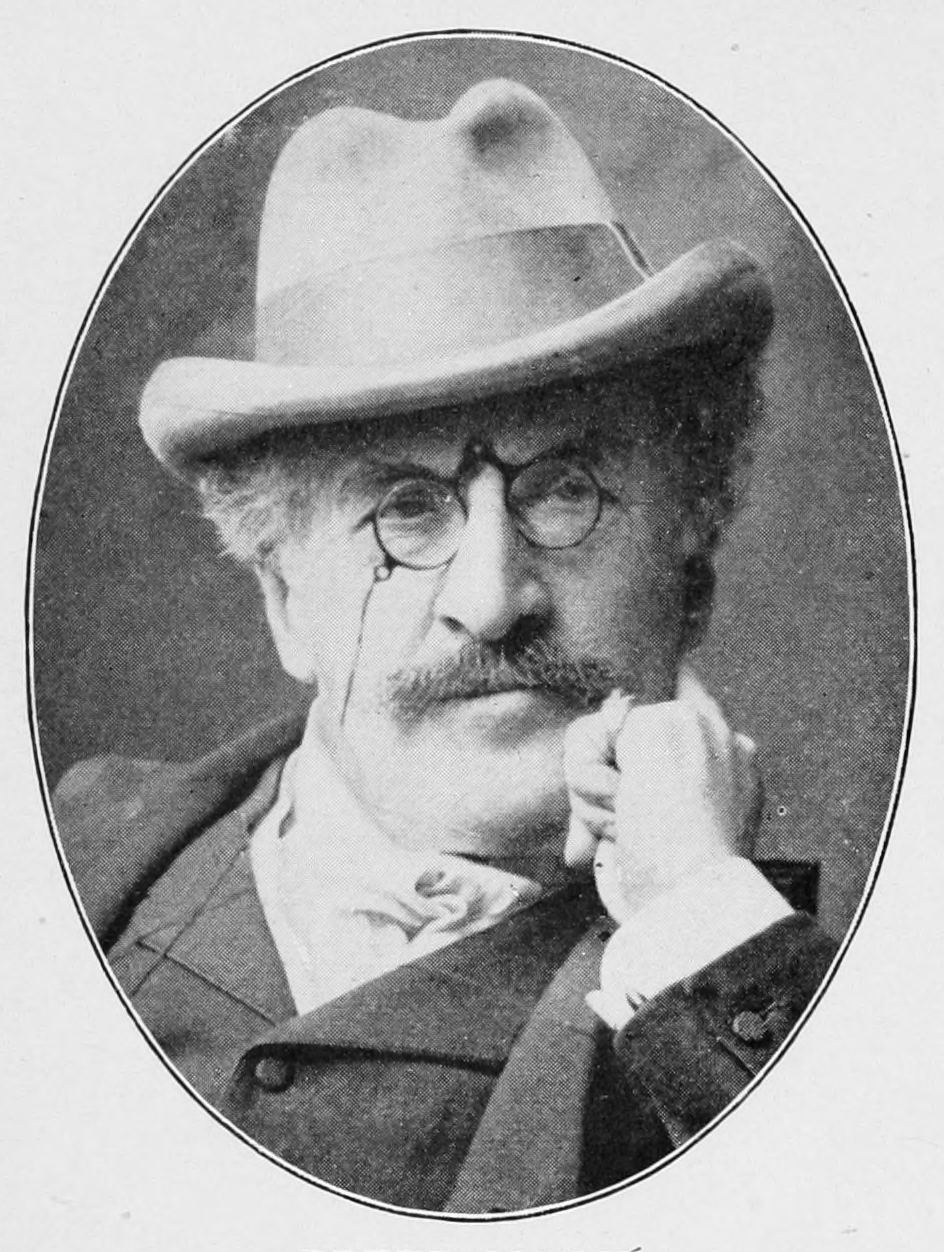
- Born: c. 1826; France
- Died: January 13, 1903 (aged 76–77); New York City, U.S.

Peter Marié (c. 1826 – January 13, 1903) was an American socialite, philanthropist, and collector of rare books and miniatures from New York City. He commissioned nearly 300 miniature portraits of Gilded Age socialites.

== Early life ==
Peter Marié was born in France in 1826. He was the fourth son in a family of nine children born to John Baptiste Marié (d. 1835), a ship merchant who traded with Mexico, and Leontine (née Arnaud) Marié, who married in 1811. Among his many siblings was eldest brother, Camille Marié (father of Sally Pendleton, first wife of Francis Key Pendleton), Joseph Marié, the Vicomtesse de Bermingham, and another sister who married Ferdinand Thieriot of Leipzig, whose father had been Chamberlain to the King of Saxony.

His maternal grandparents were General Joseph Louis Arnaud, a French planter and from Santo Domingo (now known as Haiti), and his American wife, Mary (née Nicholson) Arnaud. His paternal grandfather was a merchant from Cap Français, also in Santo Domingo. His grandfather was assassinated during a native uprising in Santo Domingo, at which point his grandmother brought Peter's mother and two aunts to New York City. His paternal grandfather was maître de port (harbour master) in Cap-Francais in the French West Indies who died in 1792 from an accidental drowning.

== Career ==
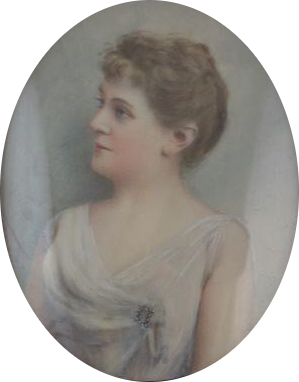
Miniature portrait of Antoinette Polk, Baroness de Charette, done by Katherine Arthur Behenna, now kept at the New York Historical Society.

Marié worked for his father and as a banker until his retirement in 1865 at the end of the American Civil War. Upon his retirement, Marié, "a man of cultivated tastes who inherited a sufficient fortune to indulge them at a comparatively early age," became a socialite in New York.

=== Miniature portraits ===
Marié commissioned up to 300 miniature portraits of female socialites, many by Fernand Paillet, of the Gilded Age. These included Edith Minturn Stokes, Hope Goddard Iselin, Emeline Winthrop, Emily Post, Frances Cleveland, Maude Adams, Anna Hall Roosevelt, and many others. A collector of rare books, he also self-published Book of Beauty, a book featuring some miniatures of Gilded Age socialites. He was also a composer of vers de société.

He intended to leave his collection of miniatures to the Metropolitan Museum of Modern Art, but his offer was turned down in February 1903. However, his collection was acquired by the New-York Historical Society in 1905. More recently, it was exhibited at the New-York Historical Society from November 11, 2011, to September 9, 2012.

== Personal life ==
According to his obituary in The New York Times, "It was the custom for men to marry young in the antebellum days, and Mr. Marié was one of the very few bachelors in town, who, although most gallant and most devoted to the fair sex, was content with his own lot, and who lived in a house of his own and entertained as a bachelor host." He hosted many society dinners from his residence at 48 West 19th Street and, later at, 6 East 37th Street in Manhattan and summered in Bar Harbor, Maine, and Newport, Rhode Island.

He died on January 13, 1903, at his residence, 6 East 37th Street, in Manhattan. His funeral took place at St. Patrick's Cathedral and he was buried at Calvary Cemetery in Woodside, Queens. Marié's estate at the time of his death was valued at $1,568,201.

=== Society life ===
In February 1892, Marié was included in Ward McAllister's "Four Hundred", purported to be an index of New York's best families, published in The New York Times. Conveniently, 400 was the number of people that could fit into Mrs. Astor's ballroom.

He first joined the Union Club of the City of New York, a private members' club in Manhattan, as early as 1854. He subsequently joined the Knickerbocker Club, the Grolier Club, the City Club of New York, the Tuxedo Club, and the Gridiron Club. Additionally, he was a member of the American Geographical Society, the New York Academy of Sciences, and the American Fine Arts Society. He made charitable contributions to the Metropolitan Museum of Art, the National Academy of Design and the American Museum of Natural History. He served as the Vice President of the New York Institute for the Blind. He also donated to Catholic outreach to the poor in New York City, but did not publicize his goodwill.
