= Mike Ryba =

American baseball player (1903–1971)

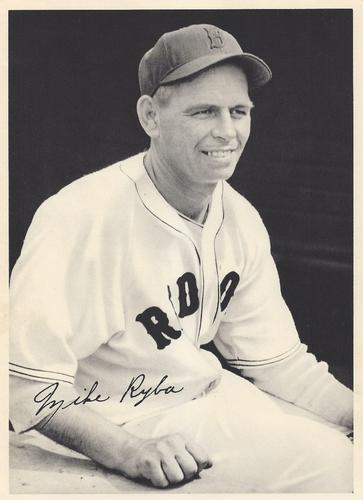
- Pitcher / Catcher
- Born: June 9, 1903; De Lancey, Pennsylvania, U.S.
- Died: December 13, 1971 (aged 68); Brookline Station, Missouri, U.S.
- Batted: Right Threw: Right

MLB debut
- September 22, 1935, for the St. Louis Cardinals

Last MLB appearance
- August 29, 1946, for the Boston Red Sox

MLB statistics
- Win–loss record: 52–34
- Earned run average: 3.66
- Strikeouts: 307
- Batting average: .235
- Runs batted in: 24
- Stats at Baseball Reference

Teams
- St. Louis Cardinals (1935–1938); Boston Red Sox (1941–1946)

Dominic Joseph "Mike" Ryba (June 9, 1903 – December 13, 1971) was an American Major League Baseball pitcher. A native of De Lancey, Pennsylvania, he attended Saint Francis University in Loretto, Pennsylvania. He was a right-hander and played for the St. Louis Cardinals (1935–38) and Boston Red Sox (1941–46). In 1946, at the age of 43, he was the second-oldest player to appear in an American League game that season.

Ryba was usually used in relief during his ten-year major league career. Ryba appeared in 10 career games as a catcher. While in the minor leagues, he played all nine positions at various points. He made his major league debut on September 22, 1935, against the Cincinnati Reds in game 1 of a doubleheader at Sportsman's Park. He pitched seven innings of two-hit relief and was the winning pitcher in the 14–4 game. He also had two hits and three runs batted in to help his cause.

In four seasons with St. Louis Ryba won 16 games, lost 9, and had an ERA of 4.39. On September 5, 1940, he was traded to the Boston Red Sox for pitcher Al Brazle. Ryba was 37 years old and had not pitched in the big leagues for two years, but his best seasons were ahead of him.

In six years with the Red Sox, Ryba won 36 games, lost 25, saved 16, and had an ERA of 3.42. Boston won the pennant in his last season, and he appeared in Game # 4 of the 1946 World Series, giving up an earned run and allowing two inherited runners to score in 2/3 of an inning. Ryba caught both games of a home doubleheader against the Cleveland Indians on July 19, 1942.

Ryba finished in his league's top ten for games finished 5 times, games pitched 3 times, saves twice, and winning percentage once.

Career totals for 250 games (240 as a pitcher) include a record of 52–34 (.605), 36 games started, 16 complete games, 2 shutouts, 132 games finished, and 16 saves. Ryba allowed 319 earned runs in 783 2/3 innings pitched for an ERA of 3.66. He wielded a strong bat for a pitcher, hitting .235 (58-for-247) with 24 RBI. He was strong defensively as well, making just seven errors as a pitcher and none as a catcher.

Ryba managed in the Red Sox, Cardinals and Cincinnati Reds farm systems after his pitching career, coached for St. Louis from 1951 to 1955, and scouted for the Cardinals and Reds until his death, at the age of 68 in Brookline Station, Missouri, when he fell from a ladder in his yard while trimming branches of a tree.

== See also ==
- List of St. Louis Cardinals coaches
