= Charles A. Whittier =

United States Army general (1840–1908)

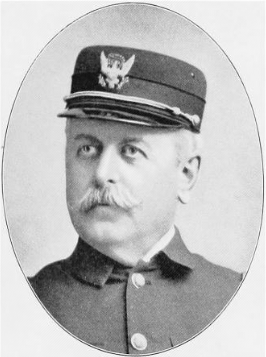
- Born: Charles Albert Whittier; August 6, 1840; Bangor, Maine, U.S.
- Died: May 14, 1908 (aged 67); At sea
- Burial place: Mount Auburn Cemetery
- Education: Harvard University
- Spouse: Elizabeth Chadwick
- Military career
- Allegiance: United States
- Branch: United States Army (Union)
- Service years: 1861–1870, 1898–1899
- Rank: Brigadier general
- Conflicts: American Civil War; Spanish–American War

Charles Albert Whittier (August 6, 1840 – May 14, 1908) was a Union Army lieutenant colonel and staff officer during the American Civil War. In 1866, he was nominated and confirmed for appointment to the grade of brevet brigadier general of volunteers to rank from April 9, 1865, the date he met the flag of truce party of the Army of Northern Virginia as that army arrived to surrender to the Union Army at Appomattox Court House, Virginia. He served as a United States Army brigadier general during the Spanish–American War.

== Early life ==
Whittier was born in Bangor, Maine on August 6, 1840. He was the son of Joseph Merrill Whittier (1811–1872) and Mary Elizabeth (née Morgan) Whittier (1816–1866). He was a relative of the poet and abolitionist John Greenleaf Whittier. His paternal grandfather was Nathaniel Whittier.

A year after his birth, Whittier's family moved from Maine to Massachusetts, where he graduated from Harvard University in 1860.

== Career ==
Following his graduation, he began the study of law with the office of Brooks and Ball, but did not finish due to the onset of the Civil War.

=== Civil War ===
Whittier first served in the Union Army as a Second Lieutenant in the 20th Massachusetts Infantry Regiment. He was promoted to First Lieutenant on January 1, 1862. Serving as aide de camp to Major General John Sedgwick in the VI Corps of the Army of the Potomac from January 1863 until Sedgwick's death, Whittier was promoted to captain on April 1, 1863, and to major on April 25, 1863. As Sedgwick's assistant adjutant general, Whittier was one of the officers who witnessed Sedgwick's death from a gunshot by a Confederate soldier on May 9, 1864. Whittier continued to serve as an assistant adjutant general in the VI Corps until January 31, 1865, when he was promoted to lieutenant colonel and became an assistant adjutant general in the II Corps (Union Army) until August 1, 1865.

On January 13, 1866, President Andrew Johnson nominated Whittier for appointment to the grade of brevet brigadier general of volunteers, to rank from March 13, 1865, and the United States Senate confirmed the appointment on March 12, 1866.

After the end of the Civil War, Whittier continued to serve as an assistant adjutant general in the Union Army and then in the Regular Army from November 30, 1866, in the Military Division of the Pacific until April 19, 1869, when he became unassigned. He was mustered out of the volunteers on November 30, 1866. He held the regular army grade of captain in the 17th Infantry Regiment from July 28, 1866. He was transferred to the 32nd Infantry Regiment on April 17, 1867, and was unassigned April 19, 1869. He was assigned to the 19th Infantry Regiment on February 15, 1870. He resigned from the army on August 3, 1870, to become a lawyer.

=== Finance career ===
In 1870, he became a partner in the Boston investment bank of Lee, Higginson & Co. He played a major role in the development of the Atchison, Topeka and Santa Fe Railway. Reportedly, through his and his followers efforts, the stock of the Atchison Railroad skyrocketed from $10 to $150 a share during the prosperous times in the Boston Stock Exchange.

=== Spanish–American War ===
At the outset of the Spanish–American War, Whittier became a lieutenant colonel and inspector general in the U.S. Army on May 10, 1898. He accompanied Major General Wesley Merritt to the Philippines. Whittier was promoted to brigadier general on August 13, 1898. He was discharged on January 31, 1899.

== Personal life ==
Whittier was married to Elizabeth Jones "Lilia" Chadwick (1846–1906), the daughter of Christopher Chadwick and sister of Dr. James Read Chadwick. In 1892, Lilia was listed on Ward McAllister's "Four Hundred". Together, they were the parents of:

- Louise Chadwick Whittier (1872–1886), who died young.
- Susan Tucker Whittier (1874–1934), who married Prince Sergei Belosselsky-Belozersky (1867–1951), a wealthy Russian landowner and soldier, in 1894.
- Pauline Whittier (1876–1946), who married Ernest Iselin (1876–1954), a Columbia University graduate and banker, in 1904. Ernest was a son of Adrian Iselin Jr. and a grandson of Adrian Georg Iselin.

In 1880, the Whittier's commissioned a large mansion that was designed by famed society architects McKim, Mead & White located at 270 Beacon Street in the Back Bay section of Boston. Reportedly the home "symbolized sophisticated and restrained wealth, and expressed ownership that knew the difference between size that was demostrative and size that was useful." They sold their Boston home in 1891 to fellow investment banker Frederick Henry Prince, who sold it to the University Club of Boston in 1892. The also maintained a home in New York City at 247 Fifth Avenue. Whittier was a member of the Somerset Club in Boston, the Metropolitan Club and Union Club in New York, and the Metropolitan Club in Washington D.C.

Whittier died at sea of apoplexy, aboard the S.S. Mauretania, on May 14, 1908. After a funeral at Grace Church in New York City, he was buried at Mount Auburn Cemetery, Cambridge, Massachusetts.

=== Descendants ===
Through his daughter Susan, he was the grandfather of Prince Sergei Sergeivich Belosselsky-Belozersky (1895–1978), who married Florence Crane (1909–1969), the granddaughter of Richard Teller Crane, in 1943; and Prince Andrei Sergeivich Belosselsky-Belozersky (1909–1961), who did not marry.

Through his daughter Pauline, he was the grandfather of Comdr. Ernest Iselin Jr., a naval attaché in Belgrade; and Louise Iselin (d. 1982), who married Augustus K. Mills III, the head of public relations for Henry Ford II.

== Published works ==
- Whittier, Charles Albert Egotistical Memoirs Typescript (1888)

== See also ==
- List of American Civil War brevet generals (Union)
