= Behenna =

Behenna is a surname. Notable people with the surname include:

- Katherine Arthur Behenna (1860–1924), Scottish-born US-based miniature portraitist, poet, spiritualist, and suffragist
- Michael Behenna (born 1983), American First Lieutenant
- Rick Behenna (1960–2012), American baseball player
