= Pauline Whittier =

American golfer (1876–1946)

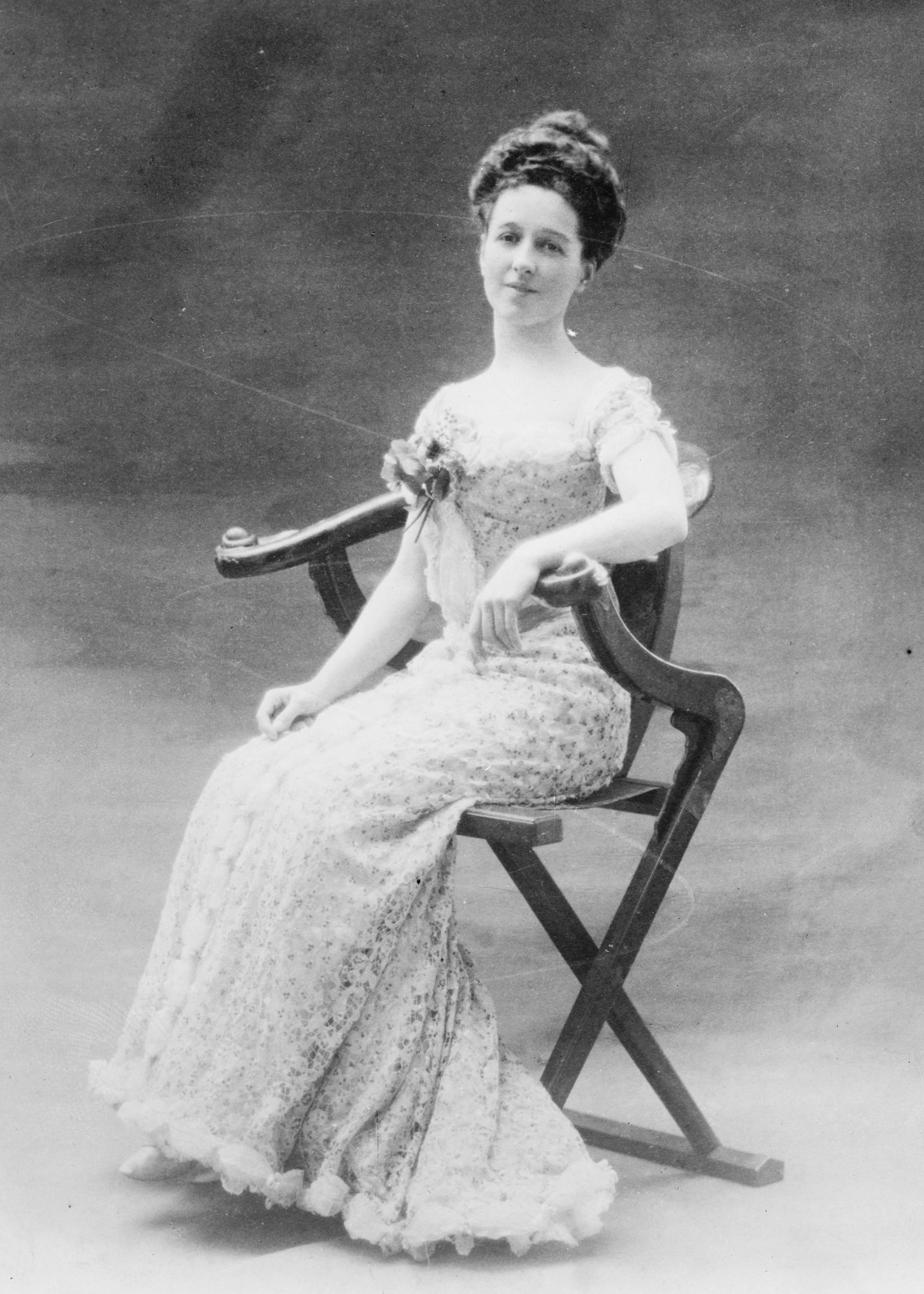

Personal information
- Nickname: Polly
- Nationality: Switzerland
- Born: December 9, 1876 Boston, Massachusetts, U.S.
- Died: June 10, 1955 (aged 78) New York, New York, U.S.

Career
- Sport: Golf
- Status: Amateur
Medal record
Women's golf
Representing Switzerland
Olympic Games
Silver medal – second place	1900 Paris	Individual

Pauline "Polly" Whittier (December 9, 1876 – March 3, 1946) was an American golfer who competed in the 1900 Summer Olympics on behalf of Switzerland.

== Career ==
Whittier was born in Boston, Massachusetts. She won the silver medal in the women's competition. She was a daughter of Col. Charles A. Whittier, and in 1904 she married Ernest Iselin, son of Adrian Iselin Jr.
