= Aiken Winter Colony Historic District III =

Historic district in South Carolina, United States

- U.S. National Register of Historic Places
- U.S. Historic district
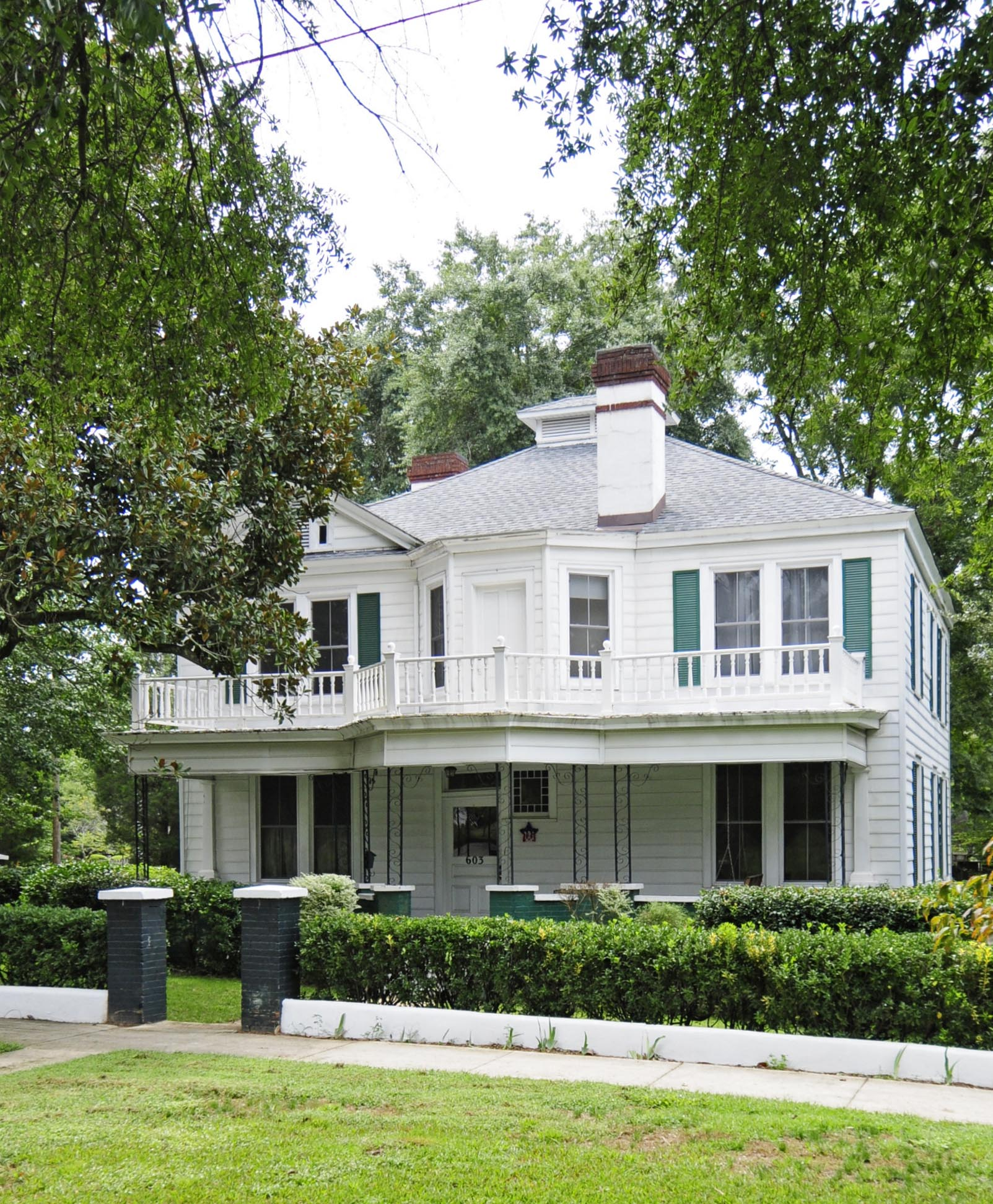
- Aiken Winter Colony Historic District

- Location within South Carolina Location within the United States
- Location: Roughly bounded by Edgefield Ave., Highland Park Dr., Fauburg, and Greenville St., Aiken, South Carolina
- Coordinates: 33°33′47″N 81°43′40″W
- Area: 66 acres (27 ha)
- Built: 1930; 96 years ago
- Architectural style: Queen Anne, Shingle Style
- MPS: Aiken Winter Colony TR
- NRHP reference No.: 84000508
- Added to NRHP: November 27, 1984

Aiken Winter Colony Historic District III, located in Aiken, South Carolina. It has 42 properties, most of which were seasonal residences of the Aiken Winter Colony. The pleasing district varies from small cottages to large estates. Architectural styles include Queen Anne, Victorian, Colonial Revival, and Classical Revival, among others. The district also includes the Aiken Preparatory School. Aiken Winter Colony Historic District III was listed in the National Register of Historic Places on November 27, 1984.

== See also ==
- Aiken Winter Colony Historic District I
- Aiken Winter Colony Historic District II
