= Parish of St. Gabriel and of St. Joseph (New Rochelle, New York) =

St. Gabriel's Church
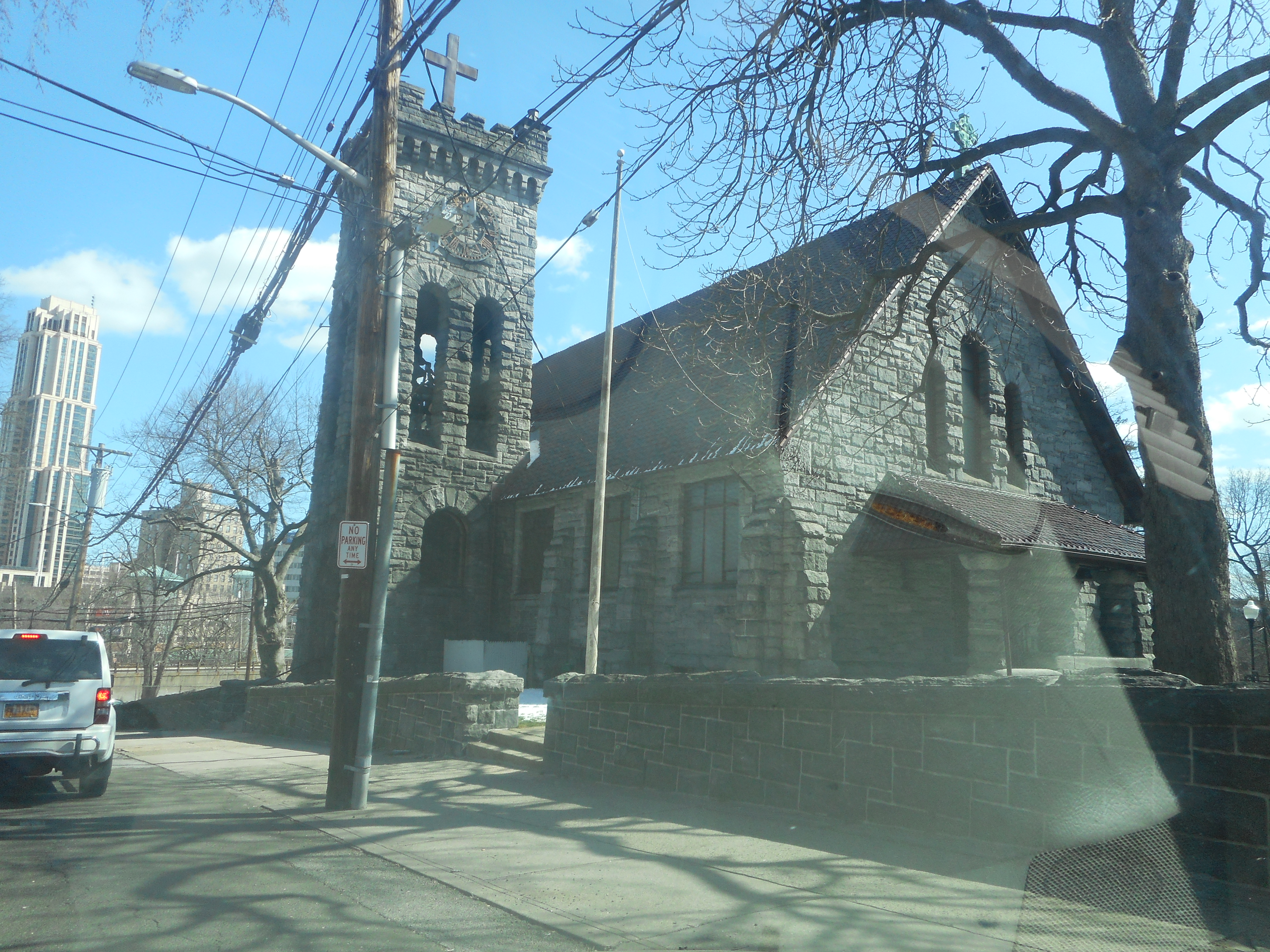
- St. Gabriel's Church
- 40°54′41″N 73°47′10″W
- Location: 120 Division Street; New Rochelle, New York
- Country: United States
- Denomination: Roman Catholic
- Website: St. Gabriel's Church

History
- Status: Parish church
- Founded: 1893

Architecture
- Functional status: Active
- Architect: William Schickel
- Style: English Norman
- Construction cost: $250,000

Administration
- Archdiocese: Archdiocese of New York

Clergy
- Pastor: Rev. Msgr. Gabriel La Paz

The Parish of St. Gabriel and of St. Joseph was formed in August 2015 with the merger of the Territorial parish of St. Gabriel on Division Street with the personal parish of St. Joseph on Washington Avenue, both in New Rochelle, NY. St. Gabriel is the parish church. However, St. Joseph "will maintain a regular schedule of Masses and the celebration of other sacraments". Both parishes were established around 1900 through the generosity of the Iselin family.

== St. Gabriel's ==
St. Gabriel's, located in the southern end of the city of New Rochelle, New York in Westchester County, was founded in 1893 by Mrs. Adrian Iselin and family, longtime residents of New Rochelle. The church was a memorial given by Mrs. Adrian Iselin and endowed by her for the Catholics of New Rochelle. The Iselin's made their summer home in New Rochelle. St. Gabriel's was consecrated on May 28, 1893, by Archbishop Michael Corrigan. Rev. John A. Kellner was appointed rector.

=== Architecture ===
The buildings of the parish are distinctly Norman-English in design. The church was built of rough-hewn slabs of Massachusetts blue granite and limestone with a steeply pitched red tile roof, and two towers with a clock and chimes. The adjacent rectory house was built in a corresponding style.

The interior features salmon colored brick walls, arched hardwood paneled ceilings and mosaic floors. The decoration of the chancel walls is in old gold and is a near perfect reproduction of the chancel of the San Marco Cathedral in Venice. The three chancel windows were designed by Franz Mayer & Co. and represent "the Saviour", "St. Francis de Sales" and "St. Margaret of Scotland". The intricately carved white marble altar is a memorial to Fannie G. Iselin.

St. Gabriel's features 17 impressive stained-glass windows crafted by Louis Comfort Tiffany Studios, The Gorham Company, Franz Mayer & Co. and Heaton, Butler and Bayne. The Tiffany windows include "The Education Of The Virgin", "The Annunciation", "The Marriage Of Joseph And Mary" and "The Baptism of Jesus". The complete set of memorial windows were gifts of the seven Iselin children in honor of their mother.

At the time of its construction, St. Gabriel's was one of the most costly houses of worship in the region. The church building, together with the rectory and a home for the Sisters of Charity, it cost $250,000. Another gift was made when the Iselin's transferred its $100,000 gymnasium building and property to the parish for a school for children. The parochial school was founded in 1898. Mrs. Iselin would later contribute a $30,000 endowment for the continued maintenance and operation of the church.

A wood-framed mosaic of Our Lady of Guadalupe by Sviat Makarenko, is enshrined in a small chapel at the rear on the east side of St. Gabriel's Church. It was presented to the parishioners of St. Gabriel's Church by their pastor, Msgr. Patrick V. McNamara, in 2003.

== St Joseph's ==
The personal parish of St. Joseph was founded in 1901 to serve the Italian Catholic community of New Rochelle. A small wooden chapel was built on 4th Street. This was, however, abandoned in 1904, when a new church on Washington Avenue was consecrated by John Cardinal Farley. The building was of red Harvard brick, as was the adjoining rectory. The church, rectory, land and furnishings, costing altogether about $50,000, were the gift of Adrian Iselin, Sr.

A parochial school was established in 1909 and was held in the basement of the church until the red brick school was completed in 1912. A convent was built on 5th Street. Both the school and the convent were gifts of Adrian Iselin's daughter, Countess Georgine Iselin.

The parish held an annual St. Anthony's Feast and Bazaar, complete with a procession of a statue of the saint around the neighborhood.

== See also ==
- Adrian Georg Iselin - with portrait of donor Eleanora O'Donnnell Iselin
