= Aiken Winter Colony Historic District I =

Historic district in South Carolina, United States

- U.S. National Register of Historic Places
- U.S. Historic district
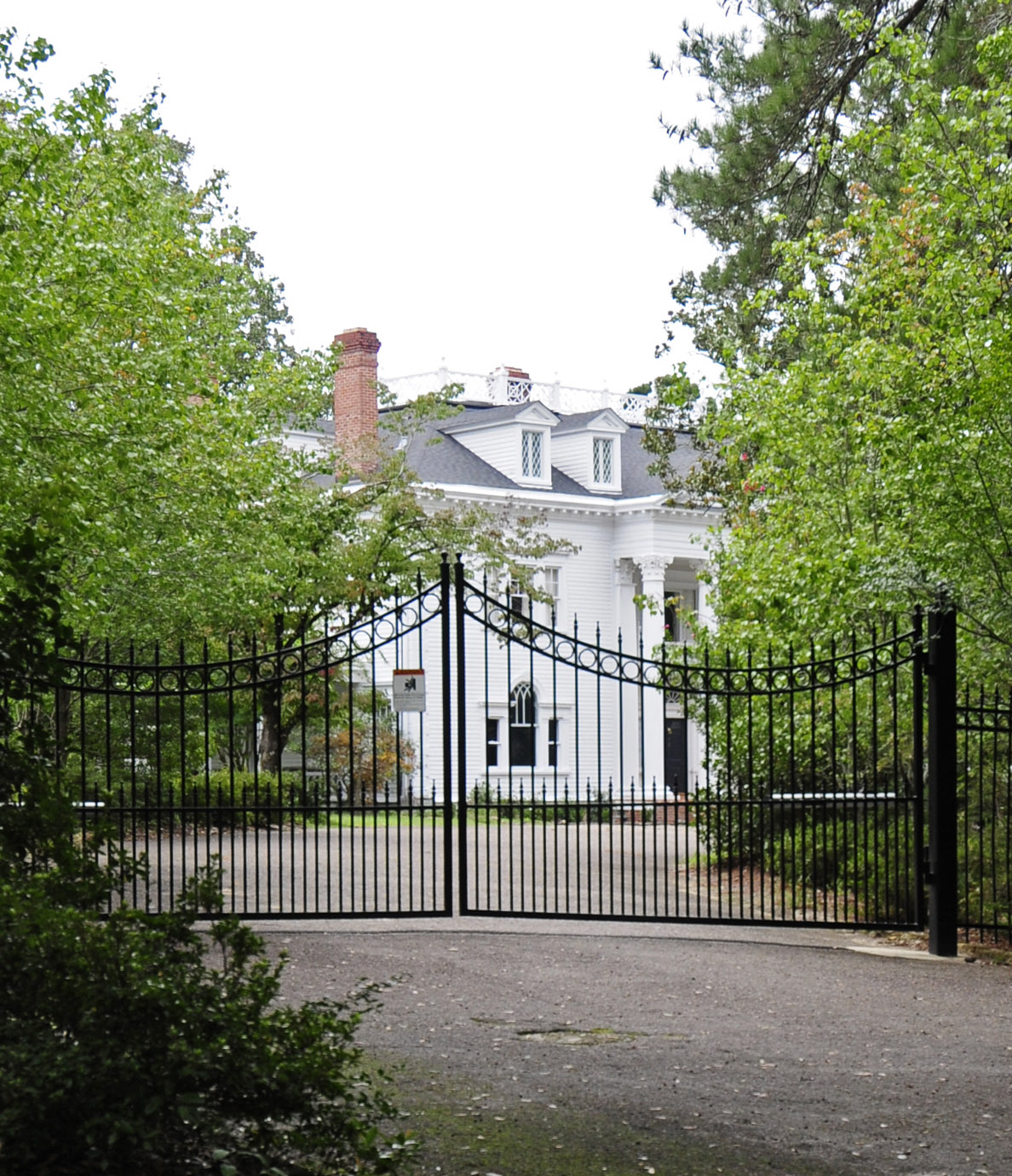
- Aiken Winter Colony Historic District I

- Location within South Carolina Location within the United States
- Location: Off U.S. 1/78, Aiken, South Carolina
- Coordinates: 33°33′53″N 81°43′55″W
- Area: 1,800 acres (730 ha)
- Built: 1948; 78 years ago
- Architect: Multiple
- MPS: Aiken Winter Colony TR
- NRHP reference No.: 84000484
- Added to NRHP: November 27, 1984

Aiken Winter Colony Historic District I, is located in Aiken, South Carolina, It is noteworthy in that it is viewed as the district most closely identified with the history of the Aiken Winter Colony. The area features over 30 properties, many of which are large impressive mansions with stables. Most of the properties were constructed between 1882 and 1948. It is possible to enjoy the district via “from the street,” but note that many of the properties and mansions are either fenced, or otherwise protected by shrubs and stately trees. Aiken Winter Colony Historic District I was listed in the National Register of Historic Places on November 27, 1984.

== See also ==
- Aiken Winter Colony Historic District II
- Aiken Winter Colony Historic District III
