= Aiken Winter Colony Historic District II =

Historic district in South Carolina, United States

- U.S. National Register of Historic Places
- U.S. Historic district
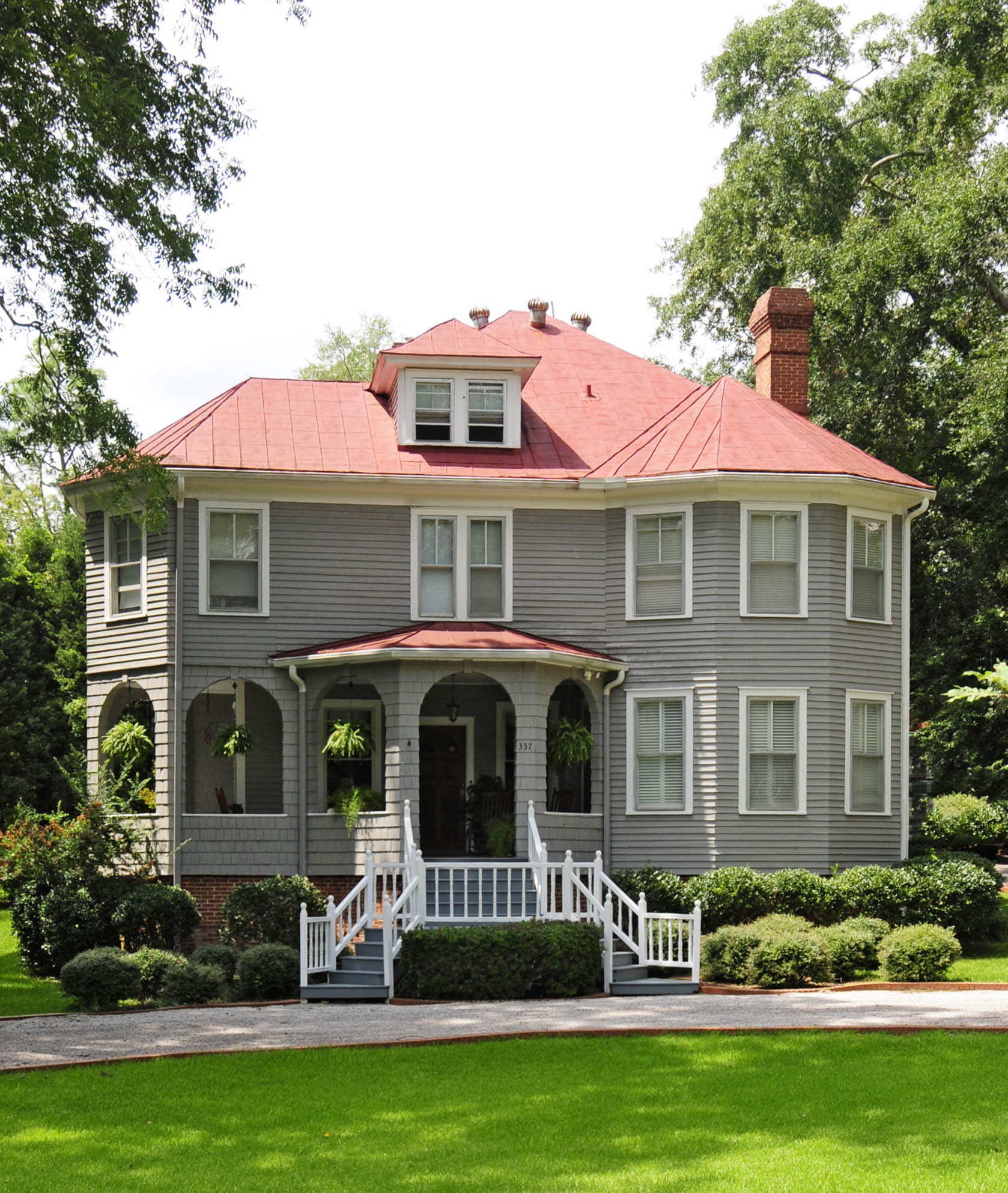
- Aiken Winter Colony Historic District II

- Location within South Carolina Location within the United States
- Location: Roughly bounded by RR track, Colleton and 3rd Aves., Laurens, South Boundary, and Marion Sts., Aiken, South Carolina
- Coordinates: 33°33′16″N 81°43′15″W
- Area: 120 acres (49 ha)
- Built: 1930; 96 years ago
- MPS: Aiken Winter Colony TR
- NRHP reference No.: 84000498
- Added to NRHP: November 27, 1984

Aiken Winter Colony Historic District II, located in Aiken, South Carolina. It is one of the three districts associated with the Aiken Winter Colony. This district, with over 100 properties, has approximately three times as many structures as Historic District I. District II also offers a number of impressive residences and outbuildings, as well the famous inn, Wilcox's.” The properties were constructed between 1880 and 1930. This visually appealing district was placed in the National Register of Historic Places on November 27, 1984.

== See also ==
- Aiken Winter Colony Historic District I
- Aiken Winter Colony Historic District III
