= Jakob Miville =

Merchant in Basel (1567–1631)

- Born: 1567; Geneva, Republic of Geneva
- Died: 3 March 1631 (aged 63–64); Basel, Old Swiss Confederacy
- Occupation: Merchant
- Spouses: Veronica Socin; Maria Schwarz
- Father: Jaques Miville

Jakob Miville (1567 – 3 March 1631) was a merchant who founded the Basel branch of the Miville family. Born in Geneva, he came to Basel from Alsace at the beginning of the 17th century and became a citizen there. As a wholesale merchant, he imported dyes, pharmaceutical goods and other colonial goods from overseas and supplied mainly pharmacies.

== Biography ==
Jakob Miville was born in 1567 in Geneva, the son of Jaques Miville, a carpenter from Cervonnex in Savoy who became a citizen of Geneva in 1569. He married first Veronica Socin and then Maria Schwarz.

At the beginning of the 17th century Miville came from Alsace to Basel, where he became a citizen in 1606 and was a member of the Saffron guild (Safranzunft); he founded the Miville family of Basel. He practiced the occupation typical of a religious refugee (Refugiant): that of a wholesale merchant (Materialist) who imported dyes and pharmaceutical goods (Drogen) as well as other colonial goods from overseas and supplied mainly pharmacies. Until 1616 he employed the Savoyard Peter Roschet (died 1638), also a refugee, who founded the family that later became the most important wholesale merchants in dyes, pharmaceutical goods and colonial goods in Basel. Miville died in Basel on 3 March 1631.

== Bibliography ==
- T. Geering, Handel und Industrie der Stadt Basel, 1886
- P. Koelner, Die Safranzunft zu Basel und ihre Handwerke und Gewerbe, 1935
