= Marcus & Co. =

Jewelry Retailer

Coordinates: 40.737°N 73.990°W

- Type: Private
- Industry: Jewelers
- Founded: 1892
- Founder: William Marcus
- Headquarters: New York City, United States

Marcus & Co. was an American luxury jewelry retailer from 1892 to 1962 in New York City.

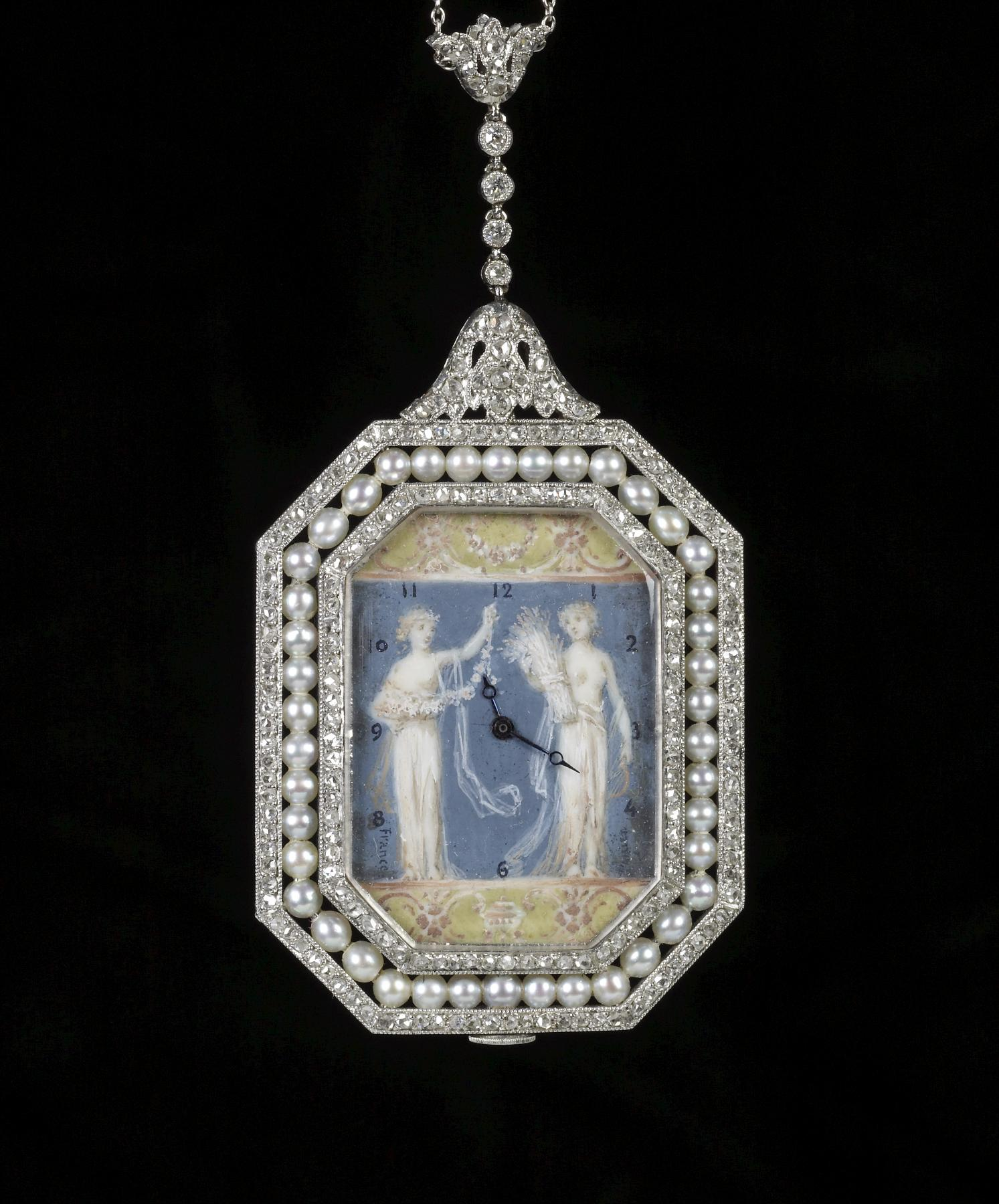
Pendant designed by Fernand Paillet for Marcus & Co., Walters Art Museum in Baltimore, Maryland.

== History ==
Marcus & Company, founded by William Elder Marcus and later joined by George Marcus and their father, Herman, a German-born former employee of Tiffany & Co., began as a partnership with George B. Jaques as Jaques & Marcus. The business changed its name to Marcus & Co. with the retirement of Jaques in 1892.

It was located at 17th Street and Broadway in Manhattan.

The designers used gemstones such as zircons, chrysoberyls, tourmalines, opals, garnets, beryls, spinels, and peridots. French miniature portraitist Fernand Paillet designed a pendant for them.

Marcus & Co. was also known for producing Art Nouveau jewelry featuring vibrant enamelwork in colors such as blue-green, dark green, and deep pink, which complemented the gemstones. Their jewelry incorporated French floral Art Nouveau motifs and often included coils of metalwork or softly curving gold lines, adding to their distinctive character.

Around 1900, Marcus & Co. incorporated synthetic rubies in select designs, demonstrating their forward-looking approach within Art Nouveau.

The company was sold to Gimbels in 1941. It merged with Black, Starr & Frost in 1962.
