= Columbus O'Donnell =

American businessman (1792–1873)

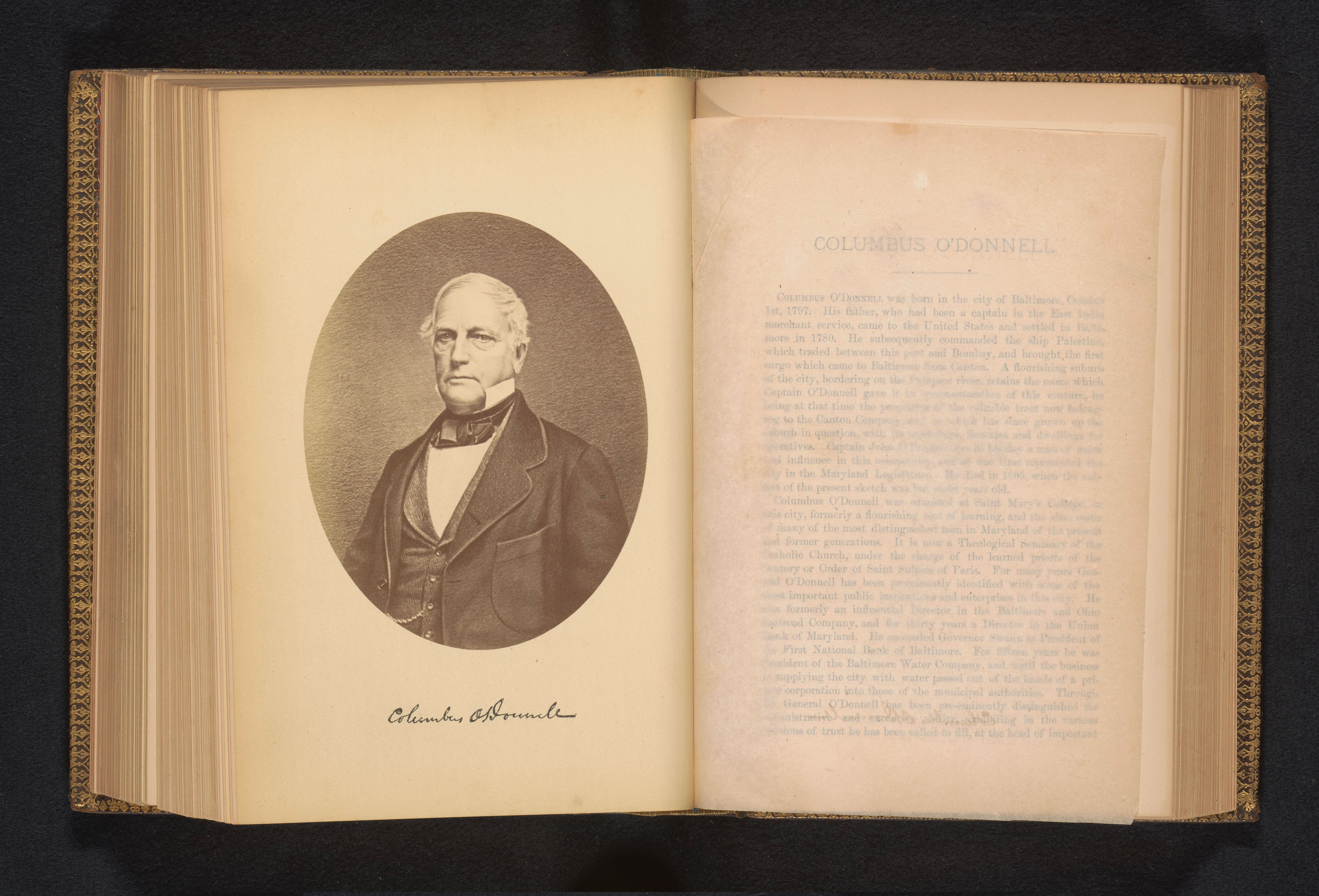
- O'Donnell from an 1866 book
- Born: Christopher Columbus O'Donnell; October 1, 1792; Baltimore, Maryland, U.S.
- Died: May 26, 1873 (aged 80); Baltimore, Maryland, U.S.
- Education: St. Mary's College
- Spouse: Eleanora C. Pascault (died 1870)
- Children: 5
- Relatives: Adrian Iselin Jr. (grandson); Columbus Iselin (grandson); Charles Oliver Iselin (grandson); Eleanora Iselin Kane (granddaughter)

Christopher Columbus O'Donnell (October 1, 1792 – May 26, 1873) was an American businessman who served as president of Baltimore's Gas and Light Company.

== Early life and education ==
O'Donnell was born on October 1, 1792, in Baltimore, Maryland. He was the son of prominent merchant, and slaveowner, Capt. John O'Donnell (1749–1805), and Sara Chew (née Elliott) O'Donnell (1766–1857). His father was born in Limerick, Ireland, and ran away to India, where he "amassed a substantial fortune from mercantile pursuits." His father likely arrived in Baltimore around 1785, eventually acquiring a 1,981 acre estate that he called Canton, that "wound around the elbow of the northwest branch of the Patapsco River, east of Fell's Point." He also bought more than 100 lots in Baltimore, the two Miller Islands in the Chesapeake Bay, a 1,628 estate in Howard County known as Never Die, and 3,000 acres in Virginia.

His paternal grandfather was John O'Donnell and his maternal grandfather were Capt. Thomas Elliott "of a well-known Quaker family and descendant of one of the Pilgrim Fathers." He was educated at St. Mary's College.

== Career ==
During the War of 1812, he fought in the Battle of North Point between General John Stricker's Maryland Militia and a British force led by Major General Robert Ross.

In 1828, O'Donnell and others petitioned the Maryland State Senate to incorporate the Canton Company, "a real estate company that was to include at the outset the Canton plantation plus all the waterfront property from Fells Point to Lazaretto Point, a total of 3,000 acres." The bill passed in 1829 and the company was given the right to lay out streets, build wharves, ships, factories, stores and homes, which O'Donnell did together with William Patterson and Peter Cooper.

He served as president of Baltimore's Gas and Light Company for thirty-nine years, president of the Baltimore Water Company for fifteen years, and was on the board of directors of the Baltimore and Ohio Railroad and the Union Bank of Baltimore. He was also an original member of the Maryland Club and was one of the commissioners appointed to lay out Druid Hill Park.

== Personal life ==
Portrait of his daughter, Mrs. Adrian Iselin (née Eleanora O'Donnell) by John Singer Sargent in 1888

O'Donnell was married to Eleanora C. Pascault (1799–1870), a daughter of French-born merchant Louis Pascault, Marquis de Poleon. Among her siblings were sisters Henriette (wife of French Gen. Jean-Jacques Reubell, who came to Baltimore with Jérôme Bonaparte), and Josephine (wife of James Gallatin, eldest son of Ambassador and Secretary Albert Gallatin) Her brother, Louis Charles Pascault, was a Capt. in the Mexican War (who married Ann Goldsborough, a granddaughter of Continental Congressman Robert Goldsborough), Together, the O'Donnells were the parents of:

- Emily O'Donnell (1818–1888), who married U.S. Representative and Mayor of Baltimore Solomon Hillen Jr.
- Eleanora O'Donnell (1821–1897), who married the New York financier Adrian Iselin.
- Charles Oliver O'Donnell (1823–1877), who married Hellen Sophia Carroll (1834–1886), a descendant of Charles Carroll of Carrollton and sister to Gov. John Lee Carroll, in 1867.
- Josephine O'Donnell, who married Thomas Sim Lee, a grandson of Gov. Thomas Sim Lee, in 1843.
- Christopher Columbus O'Donnell Jr., who married Caroline Jenkins.

O'Donnell died on Mary 26, 1873, in Baltimore. In his will, he left his estate to his children and grandchildren, with specific bequests of $5,000 to the Maryland Institution for the Instruction of the Blind, $5,000 to St. Mary's Industrial School for Boys, and $5,000 to the Roman Catholic Asylum for Widows.

=== Descendants ===
Through his son Charles, he was a grandfather of John Charles O'Donnell (1868–1914), who married Julia Edie (a granddaughter of U.S. Representative John Rufus Edie) and lived in Montreux, Switzerland.

Through his daughter Eleanora, he was a grandfather of Adrian Iselin Jr. (1846–1935), William Emil Iselin (1848–1937), Eleanora Iselin Kane (1849–1938), Columbus O'Donnell Iselin (1851–1933), Charles Oliver Iselin (1854–1932), Papal Countess Georgine Iselin (1857–1954), and Emilie Eleanora Iselin Beresford (1860–1916).
