= James Read Chadwick =

American gynecologist (1844–1905)

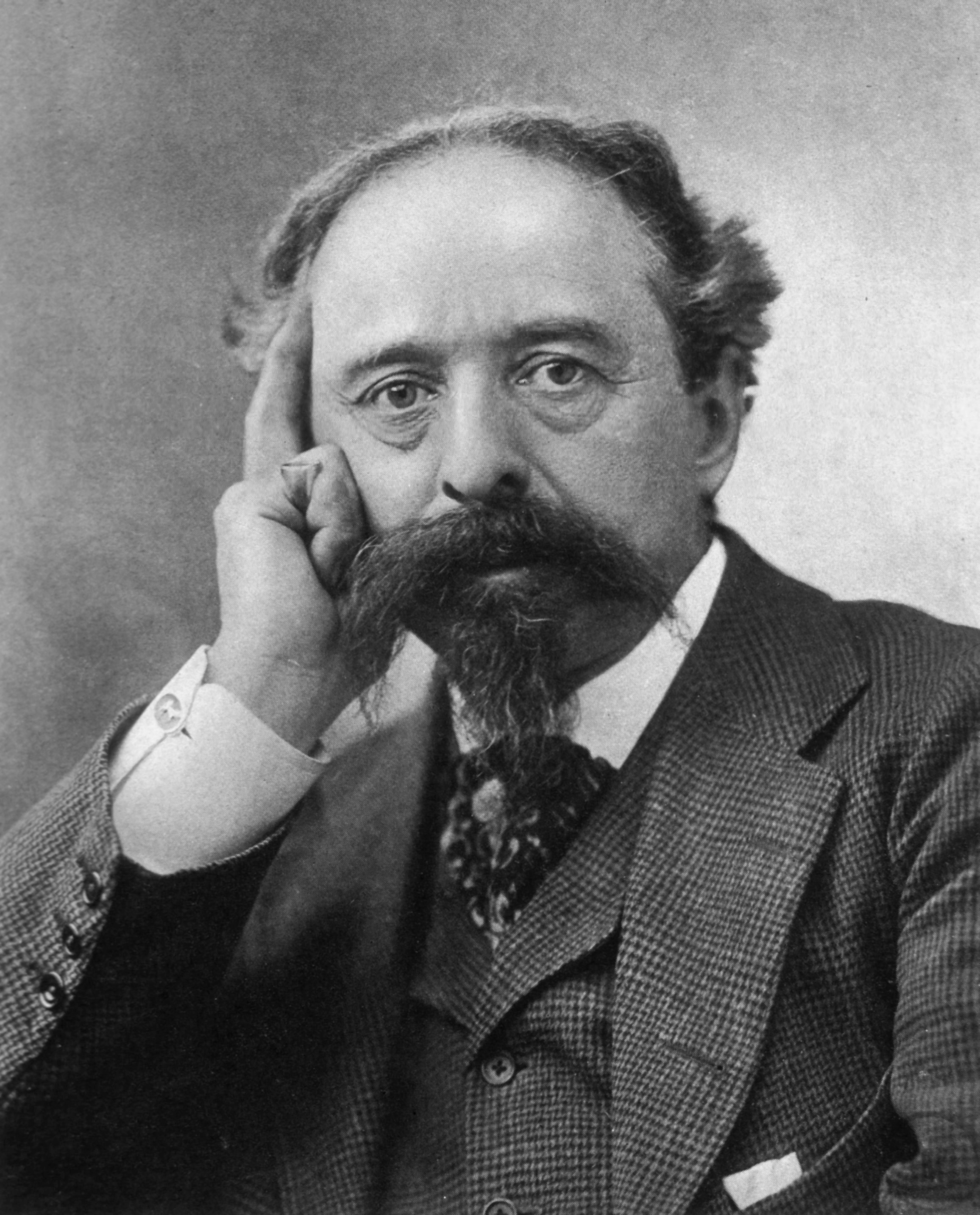
- Born: November 2, 1844; Boston, Massachusetts, U.S.
- Died: September 23, 1905 (aged 60); Chocorua, New Hampshire, U.S.
- Education: Harvard University; Harvard Medical School
- Spouse: Katherine Maria Lyman (m. 1871; died 1889)
- Relatives: Elizabeth Chadwick Whittier (sister)

James Read Chadwick (November 2, 1844 – September 23, 1905) was an American gynecologist and medical librarian remembered for describing the Chadwick sign of early pregnancy in 1887.

== Early life and education ==
Chadwick was born in Boston on November 2, 1844. He was a son of Christopher Chamberlain Chadwick (1821–1871), a Boston merchant, and Louisa (née Read) Chadwick (1821–1913). His sister, Elizabeth (née Chadwick) Whittier, was married to Brig. Gen. Charles A. Whittier.

He received a B.A. at Harvard in 1865, an M.D. from Harvard Medical School in 1871, studied obstetrics in Europe from 1871 to 1873, and then worked as a gynecologist in Boston.

== Career ==
From 1874 he worked at the Boston City Hospital, helping to found the gynecological department, and taught at Harvard Medical School. He helped to found, and became secretary and president of the American Gynaecological Society. He was a founder of the Boston Medical Library Association in 1875, and worked as the librarian until his death. He was voted president of the Association of Medical Librarians in 1904. He was the first president of the Harvard Medical Alumni Association in 1891. He was a supporter of women in the practice of medicine, writing a report which cited the contributions of women in medicine.

A strong advocate of cremation, he was president of the Massachusetts Cremation Society from 1894 until his sudden death in 1905.

He contributed many articles on his specialty to the Transactions of the American Gynecological Association, the Boston Medical and Surgical Journal, the American Journal of Obstetrics, among others.

== Personal life ==
On May 11, 1871, Chadwick was married to Katherine Maria Lyman (1848–1889) in Boston. Maria was the daughter of Dr. George Hinckley Lyman and his wife, Maria Cornelia Ritchie Austin. Her younger brother was George H. Lyman, chairman of the Massachusetts Republican state committee and Collector of Customs for the Port of Boston, and her great-grandfather was Elbridge Gerry, a signer of the Declaration of Independence and Vice President of the United States (under President James Madison). Together, they were the parents of three daughters and two sons, including:

- Nora Chadwick (1873–1961), who married Julian Codman, a grandson of merchant Russell Sturgis and nephew of architect John Hubbard Sturgis.
- Margaret Chadwick
- Elizabeth Lyman "Bessie" Chadwick (1875–1912), who married Douglas H. Thomas (1872–1915) in 1901.
- James Read Chadwick Jr. (1877–1879), who died young.
- Elbridge Gerry Chadwick (1881–1945), who married Dorothy Curtis Jordan, a granddaughter of Eben Dyer Jordan (co-founder of the department store chain Jordan Marsh).

His wife died on July 13, 1889, in Birmingham, England. Chadwick died from a fall from a piazza roof at his summer home in Chocorua, New Hampshire, on September 23, 1905. He was buried at Mount Auburn Cemetery in Cambridge.
