= Adrian Iselin =

American businessman (1818–1905)

- Born: January 17, 1818; Scotland, United Kingdom
- Died: March 28, 1905 (aged 87); New York City, New York, U.S.
- Resting place: Woodlawn Cemetery
- Education: Columbia College (1837)
- Occupations: Merchant, banker, financial investor
- Spouse: Eleanora O'Donnell (m. 1845; died 1897)
- Children: 7, including Eleanora, Columbus, Charles
- Parent(s): Isaac Iselin; Aimee Jeanne Roulet

Adrian Georg Iselin (January 17, 1818 – March 28, 1905) was a New York financier who invested in and developed real estate, railroads, and mining operations. For many years during his early business career he was engaged in importing with his brother, William Iselin, being one of the most successful merchants of New York in the middle of the century. After retiring from the importing trade, he established the banking house of Adrian Iselin & Co. He is considered the founder of the Iselin family in the United States.

== Early life ==
Iselin was born in Scotland on January 17, 1818, while his parents were making a tour of the British Isles. He was fifth of eleven children born to Isaac Iselin (1783–1841), who was born in Basel, Switzerland, and emigrated to the United States in 1801, and Aimee Jeanne (née Roulet) Iselin (1792–1873), a Swiss-French daughter of John Roulet.

In Switzerland, the Iselin family had been merchants, public officials, and military and professional men since the 14th century. Adrian's father Isaac, who began his career in New York at Gouverneur & Kemble and later at LeRoy, Bayard and McEvers, amassed a large fortune in the importing business which was passed down to him and his siblings.

Iselin was educated abroad in Switzerland. However, he is also shown to have been matriculated at one point at Columbia College with the class of 1837 but did not graduate, according to official documents.

== Career ==
Iselin first joined the New York dry goods company of Messers, Cattenet, Barbey and Co., shortly thereafter going independent and in 1840 forming Moran & Iselin, an imported dry goods firm that expanded to become involved with banking. When Moran retired in 1854, Iselin reorganized and continued the banking arm of the business under A. Iselin and Co. at his office located at 36 Wall Street.

Iselin was one of the directors of the Sioux City and St. Paul Railroad Company in Minnesota. The town of Adrian, Minnesota, which developed after completion of the rail lines, was named after his mother, Mrs. Adrian Iselin. In 1881, Iselin formed the Pittsburgh and State Line Railroad after Rochester and State Line Railroad was put into receivership.

Iselin eventually became the chief investor in the Rochester and Pittsburgh Coal and Iron Company. (Note: The Rochester and Pittsburgh Coal and Iron Company was a subsidiary of the Buffalo, Rochester and Pittsburgh Railway.) At the outbreak of the Civil War, his firm was so strong that it helped to finance the United States Government. In 1885, the Rochester and Pittsburgh Coal and Iron Company constructed the world's longest string of coke ovens in Walston, Pennsylvania, with 475 ovens over a length of 2 km (1.25 miles). Their output reached 22,000 tons per month.

At his death, he left the management of his investments and companies to two of his sons, Adrian Jr. and Columbus. Adrian Jr., who joined the firm in 1868, was responsible for the expansion of the Company into Indiana County, Pennsylvania. Ernest Iselin, son of Adrian Jr., was director of the company from 1929 to 1934 and chairman of the board from 1936 to 1954. The firm was in existence until 1936 when it was merged with Dominick & Dominick, an investment and merchant banking firm that exists to this day.

=== Later life ===
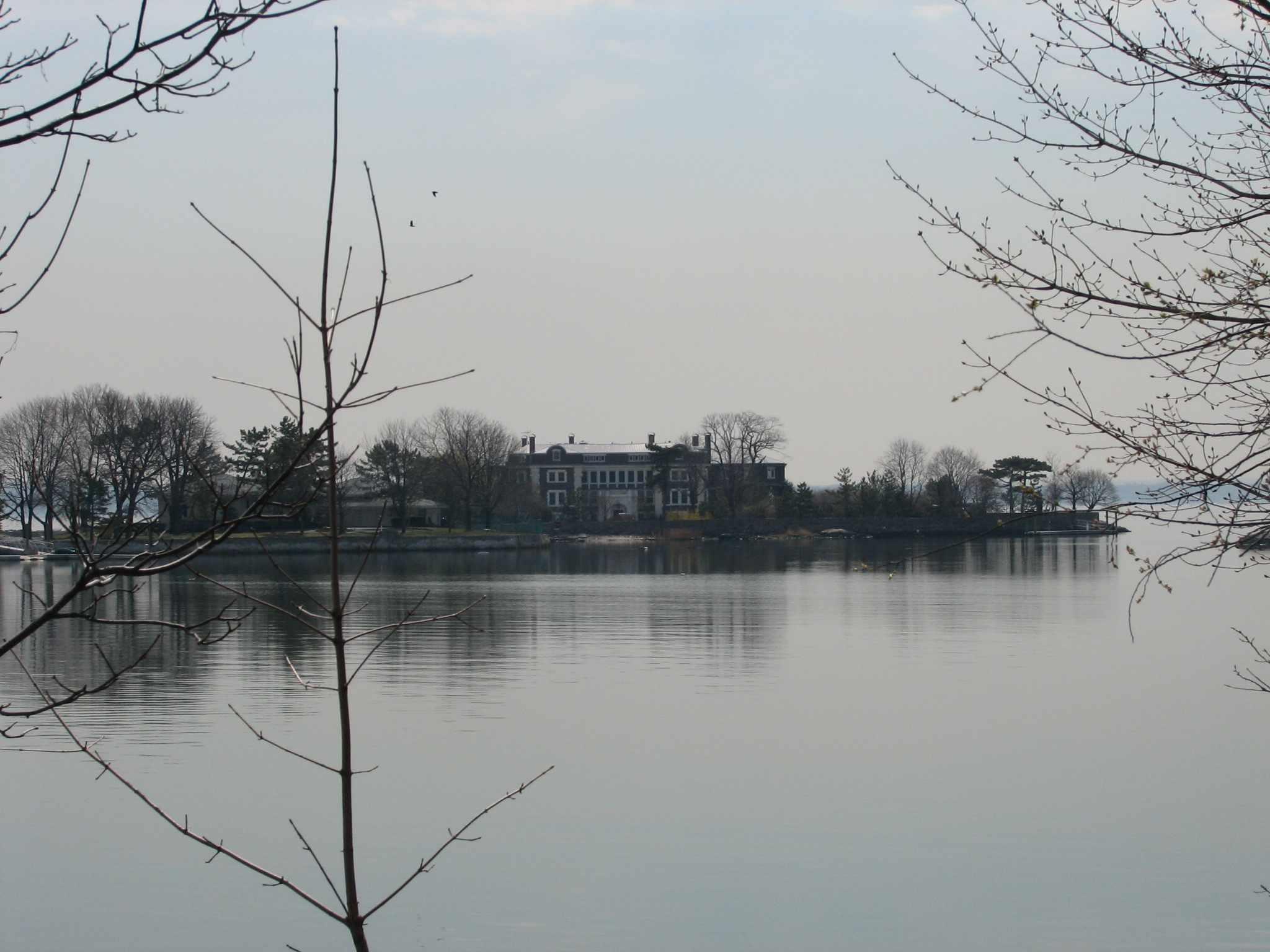

An avid yachtsman, Adrian was drawn to the Long Island Sound shore community of New Rochelle, New York in 1858 as the site of his country estate All View. Over forty years he transformed the farms along the New Rochelle waterfront and Davenport Neck peninsula into extraordinary waterfront estates for each of his children.

When he retired from business in 1878, Iselin decided to focus much of his attention on improving conditions within his community of New Rochelle. Using the family's large expanses of farm land in the northern end of town, he constructed a reservoir system which became the area's first water company. He also established the first City Savings Bank and built a fully equipped "gymnasium" for the resident public to use. Adrian and his wife, and subsequently their daughters Miss Georgine and Mrs. Elenora (Delancey Kane) were major funders of Catholic causes, establishing Saint Gabriel's Roman Catholic Church and its parochial school, as well as New Rochelle Hospital. Sons Adrian, Jr., William E., Columbus O'Donnell, and Charles Oliver were all successful businessmen. Adrian and Columbus bought extensive property in the community and developed the Residence, Neptune, Homestead and Sycamore "residence park" neighborhoods.

== Personal life ==
Mrs. Adrian Iselin (née Eleanora O'Donnell), John Singer Sargent, 1888

On December 11, 1845, married Eleanora O'Donnell (1821–1897), the daughter of General Columbus O'Donnell and his wife Eleanora (née Pascault) O'Donnell, in Baltimore, Maryland. Eleanora was related to John Carroll, the first Roman Catholic bishop in the United States and the founder of Georgetown University. (Note: Although he donated significant funds (in excess of $1,000,000 to Catholic Charities) and the fact that Eleanora, his wife, and several of his children were Catholic, Adrian was not a Catholic himself.) Her father was at the head of one of the foremost families of that city, and was a leading financier of Maryland, being connected with the Baltimore & Ohio Railroad and other important corporations. Together, they were the parents of seven children, including:

- Adrian Iselin Jr. (1846–1935), who married Louise Caylus (1862–1909) in 1872. After her death, he married Sarah Gracie King Bronson (1850–1931), the widow of Frederic Bronson in 1914.
- William Emil Iselin (1848–1937), who married Alice Rogers Jones (1850–1932).
- Eleanora Iselin (1849–1938), who married DeLancey Astor Kane (1848–1915), brother of Woodbury Kane and great-grandson of John Jacob Astor, in 1872.
- Columbus O'Donnell Iselin (1851–1933), who married Edith Colford Jones (1854–1930).
- Charles Oliver Iselin (1854–1932), who first married Fannie Garner (1861–1890). After her death, he married Edith Hope Goddard (1868–1970) in 1894.
- Georgine Iselin (1857–1954), who was made a Papal Countess in 1912 and did not marry.
- Emilie Eleanora Iselin (1860–1916), who married John George Beresford (1847–1925), a cousin of Lord Charles Beresford and grandson of Henry Beresford, 2nd Marquess of Waterford, in 1898.

Socially, Adrian Iselin and his family were among the wealthiest of New York high society. In New York City Iselin was a stockholder in the Metropolitan Opera House and Real Estate Company, along with other wealthy men that included Cornelius Vanderbilt and J.P. Morgan. Iselin was one of the incorporators of the American Museum of Natural History, the Metropolitan Museum of Art, and the Society for the Prevention of Cruelty to Animals. For many years he was the Consul of the Swiss Republic in New York.

Iselin's wife died in 1897 and left her entire estate to him. He died at his residence in New York City, 23 East 26th Street, on March 28, 1905. His funeral service was held at his New York City home followed by a burial at Woodlawn Cemetery in the Bronx. According to his obituary in The New York Times, Iselin's wealth was estimated to be between $20 and $30 million. His estate was formally valued at $18,500,000 by the New York State Tax Appraiser later in 1905.

=== Descendants ===
Through his son Columbus, he was the great-grandfather of Columbus O'Donnell Iselin (1904-1971), the oceanographer who was the director of the Woods Hole Oceanographic Institution and a professor of Physical Oceanography at Harvard University and the Massachusetts Institute of Technology.

Through his son Charles, he was the grandfather of Eleanora "Nora" Iselin (1881–1939), who married Count Ferdinand von Colloredo-Mansfeld (1878–1967), an attache of the Austrian Embassy at Rome and a nephew of Prince Colloredo-Mansfeld, in 1909.

=== Family legacy ===
The coal-mining town of Iselin, one of the many company towns in Indiana county founded by the Rochester and Pittsburgh Coal and Iron Company, was named after him. The Iselin family also controlled the Buffalo, Rochester and Pittsburgh Railway Company, which transported coal from Pennsylvania to markets along the Great Lakes and Canada.

He and his family were responsible for the building a number of Roman Catholic churches in his coal company towns, including St. Adrian's in Adrian, Pennsylvania, as well as several hospitals, including the Adrian Hospital in Punxsutawney, and the Indiana Hospital in Indiana, Pennsylvania.

In the 1870s, Unionville, New Jersey, previously known at Perrytown, was renamed Iselin after Adrian Georg Iselin.

The town of Adrian Mines, Pennsylvania, was named after the family as well.

The town of Adrian, Minnesota, was also named after the family.
