= Francis Key Pendleton =

American judge

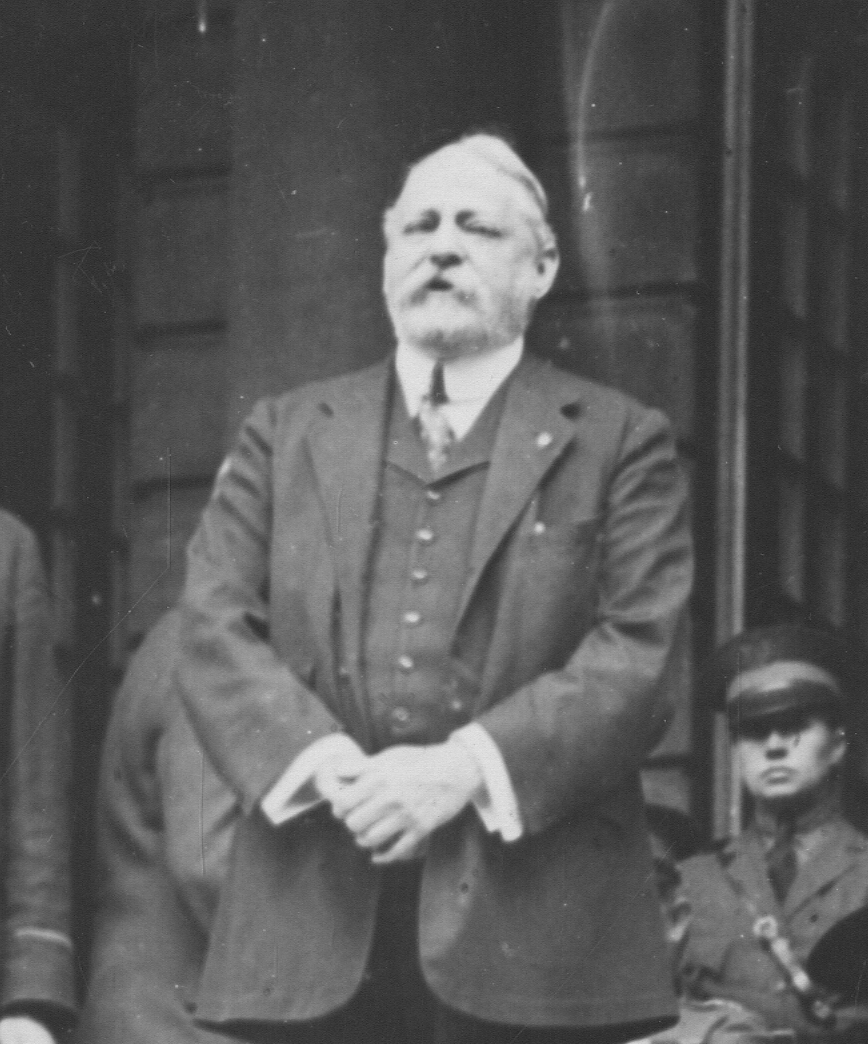
- Born: January 1, 1850; Cincinnati, Ohio, U.S.
- Died: July 26, 1930 (aged 80); New York City, New York, U.S.
- Resting place: Woodlawn Cemetery; New York City, New York, U.S.
- Education: Harvard College; Harvard Law School
- Spouses: Sarah Marié (m. 1885; died 1886) Elizabeth La Montagne (m. 1889)
- Parent(s): George H. Pendleton; Mary Alicia Key Pendleton
- Relatives: Francis Scott Key (grandfather); Nathanael Pendleton (grandfather)

Francis Key Pendleton (January 1, 1850 – July 26, 1930) was an American lawyer and judge who was prominent in New York society during the Gilded Age. He was a justice of the Supreme Court of New York.

== Early life ==
Pendleton, known as Frank, was born on January 1, 1850 in Clifton, Ohio (now part of Cincinnati). He was the son of George Hunt Pendleton and Mary Alicia (née Key) Pendleton. Among his siblings were Sarah Pendleton, who was born in Ireland, Mary Lloyd Pendleton, Jane Francis Pendleton, and George Hunt Pendleton Jr., who died young. His father, a former president of the Kentucky Central Railroad, served as the U.S. Minister to Germany, a U.S. Representative, and the U.S. Senator for Ohio, where he was chair of the Senate Democratic Caucus.

Pendleton's maternal grandfather was Francis Scott Key, best known today for writing a poem which later became the lyrics for "The Star-Spangled Banner". His paternal grandfather was U.S. Representative Nathanael Greene Pendleton.

Pendleton prepared for college with Eugene F. Bliss in Cincinnati. He attended Harvard College, graduating in 1870. While at Harverd, he was member of Delta Kappa Epsilon. After spending three years abroad studying French and German, he attended Harvard Law School in 1875.

== Career ==
After graduating from Harvard Law, Pendleton moved to New York City, where he began practicing law with Parrish. In 1870, that firm was dissolved and he formed a partnership with E. Ellery Anderson and P.C. Anderson, known as Anderson, Pendleton & Anderson PC.

In 1907, Pendleton was appointed Corporation Counsel by the Democratic Mayor of New York City, George B. McClellan Jr., succeeding William B. Ellison. McClellan's father (George B. McClellan) and Pendleton's father (George H. Pendleton) were the Democratic Party's nominees for president and vice-president for the 1864 election.

In 1911, Pendleton was appointed a justice of the Supreme Court of New York by Democratic Governor John Alden Dix. He was reelected for a term ending on December 31, 1921. He left the bench, effective April 1, 1920, stating: "I have had it in contemplation for a long time, but as I have a case on hand at trial and some judicial work to complete, I have set a date of severance with the judiciary at April 1. I intend to return to the practice of the law and will be at the head of the old firm of Pendleton, Anderson, Iselin & Riggs, with offices at 25 Broad Street." His resignation caused a vacancy that was filled by Democratic Governor Al Smith.

== Personal life ==
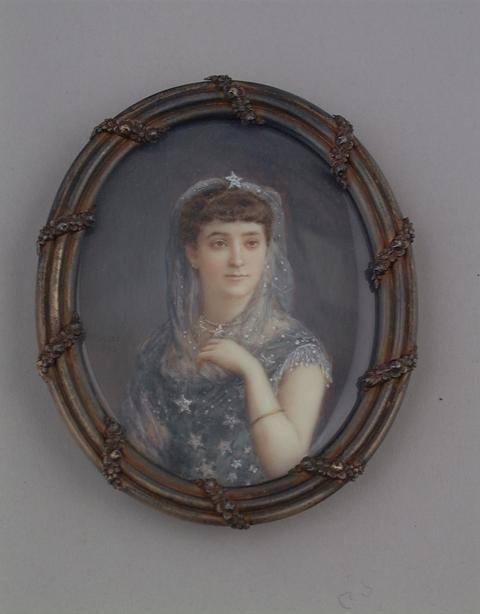
Sally Marié Pendleton, portrait by Fernand Paillet

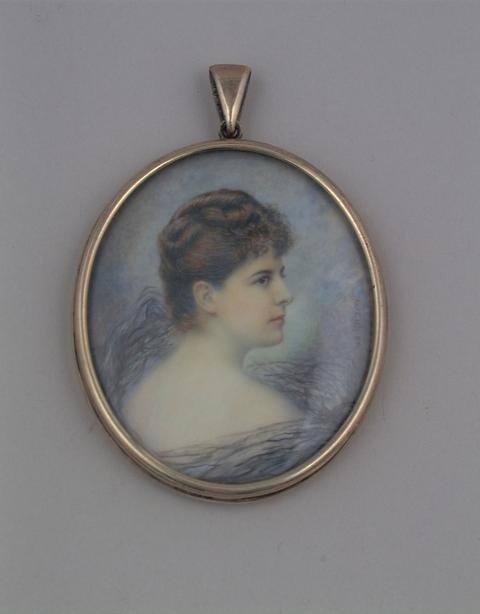
Elizabeth La Montagne Pendleton, portrait by Carl A. Weidner

On July 1, 1885, Pendleton was married to Sarah "Sallie" Marié (1862–1886), daughter of Rachel (née Steward) and Camille Marié and the niece of Peter Marié. She died of pneumonia less than a year after their marriage on March 14, 1886.

On December 10, 1889, Pendleton was married to Elizabeth La Montagne (c. 1870–1936). She was the daughter of Augustus La Montagne and granddaughter of New York property developer Thomas E. Davis. Together, they were the parents of a son, George Hunt Pendleton, who was born in 1895.

In 1892, Pendleton and his wife were included in Ward McAllister's "Four Hundred", purported to be an index of New York's best families, published in The New York Times. Pendleton was a member of the Knickerbocker Club, the Union Club of the City of New York, the Downtown Athletic Club, the Turf and Field Club, the City Midday Club, and the Riding and Meadow Brook Club. He was also a vice-president of the Society of the Cincinnati.

Pendleton was injured in an automobile accident on Riverside Drive in May 1930. He died as a result of his injuries on July 26, 1930 in Manhattan, New York City. After a funeral at St. Thomas's Church, he was buried at Woodlawn Cemetery in the Bronx.
