= Walston, Pennsylvania =

Unincorporated community in Pennsylvania, U.S.

Coordinates: 40°57′54″N 78°59′41″W

Walston is an unincorporated community in Jefferson County, in the U.S. state of Pennsylvania.

== History ==
Walston got its start circa 1883 when the Buffalo, Rochester and Pittsburgh Railway was extended to the coal mines located there. A post office has been in operation at Walston since 1885.
