= Iselin Seamount =

Seamount in the Southern Ocean off Antarctica

Coordinates: 70°45′S 178°15′W

Iselin Seamount is a seamount in the Southern Ocean of Antarctica. It was named for the research ship Iselin II of the Woods Hole Oceanographic Institute, the name being approved by the Advisory Committee for Undersea Features in February 1964.
