= Iselin Michelsen =

Norwegian singer and model

- Website: iselinmichelsen.blogg.se

Iselin Michelsen (born 15 September 1990), also known as "Paradise"-Iselin, is a Norwegian glamour model and singer. She was a contestant of the Norwegian version of the Paradise Hotel reality show. Her 2012 debut single "Chewing Gum" (written by Lars Skaland, Helfner Hotvedt, Bjørn Alex Olsen, Trond Hillestad and Hugo Solis), was characterized by critics as the "worst music video ever" and she has been described as "Norway's Rebecca Black". Michelsen defended the song in an interview with the TV guide magazine Se og Hør, saying "Jeg bryr meg ikke om folk ler av dette. [I do not care if people laugh at this]"; and that she considers the song to be a serious effort.
