= Katherine Arthur Behenna =

American painter

- Born: Katherine Arthur; 18 December 1861; Helensburgh, Scotland
- Died: 20 September 1926; London
- Resting place: Chingford Cemetery, London E4
- Other names: K. A. Behenna, Katherine Arthur-Behenna, Kathleen A. Behenna; John Prendergast, John Prendregeist (pseudonyms)
- Occupation(s): Painter, poet, lecturer, spiritualist, suffragist
- Spouse: Henry Carstairs Behenna (divorced)

Katherine Arthur Behenna (born 1860 – 21 September 1926), also known as Kathleen Arthur Behenna, was a Scottish-born portrait miniaturist, poet, spiritualist, and suffragist. She sometimes wrote articles using the masculine pseudonyms John Prendergast and John Prendregeist.

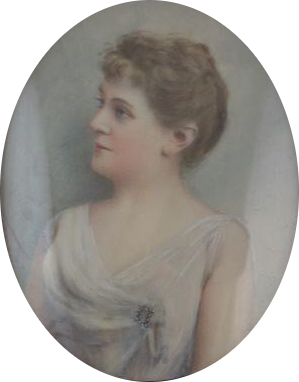
Miniature portrait of Antoinette Polk done by Katherine Arthur Behenna, now kept at the New-York Historical Society.

== Early life ==
Katherine Arthur was born in 1860 in Helensburgh, Scotland. She and her brother William were twins. Their father Alexander Arthur was from Montreal, Canada. She was educated in Montreal, Boston, as well as at the Art Students League of New York and the Académie Julian in Paris. In New York, she studied with George de Forest Brush, Carroll Beckwith, and John Henry Twachtman. She married Henry Behenna in 1885.

== Career ==
=== Painting and organizing ===
Behenna painted miniature portraits on ivory, often of American socialites of the Gilded Age for art collector Peter Marié, including Antoinette Polk, Baroness de Charette Anna Hall Roosevelt, and Amélie Rives Troubetzkoy. She also made a portrait of Louise, Princess Royal. Her work was exhibited at the Royal Academy of Arts and the Modern Gallery in London. She also painted five panels of a frieze, The Path of the Soul, displayed at the Tiffany Glass Building in New York in 1906. She later moved to Étaples, France, where she was a member of the Etaples art colony.

In 1915, Behenna was organizing chair of the Imperial Order of the Daughters of the Empire, and created chapters in New York and Baltimore, to prepare and coordinate women's relief efforts during World War I. Behenna was a suffragist.

=== Disappearance and spiritualism ===
In 1907 she was in Ottawa to show her miniatures and paint Lady Evelyn Grey, daughter of the Governor General, when she disappeared, prompting a police investigation. She explained later that she had decided to take a train to Virginia, because "I went to Ottawa an optimist and returned a pessimist," elaborating that "I was chilled to the soul by the atmosphere of petty malice, superficiality, lack of courtesy and active hostility in which I found myself."

Behenna was interested in spiritualism. In 1899, she told the press that she had been contacted by a spirit named Helios, and told the location of a gold mine in the United States. Helios also instructed her to adopt a specific diet, and to write an epic poem in eight cantos, about Rameses II. She wrote a short book of poems, which she claimed to have received "through auditory control" from the spirit realm, Mystic Songs of Fire and Flame (1921). She used the masculine pseudonyms John Prendregeist and John Prendergast, interpreting the surname as meaning "to grasp the spirit."

In 1921, Behenna lectured in Washington, D.C., on "Color: Its Effect on Human Health and the Preservation of Youth in the Body", and read her poetry at the Arts Club of Washington. In 1922, she visited Montreal to lecture on "The Coming Race". In 1923, she explained to audiences that "the time will come... when everyone must live right, and think pure thought, as everyone else will be able to read their mind and tell what they are thinking about."

== Personal life and legacy ==
Katherine Arthur briefly married Henry Carstairs Behenna in 1885, and divorced shortly after. They had a daughter, Vivian Margaret Behenna. Katherine Behenna died from a cerebral haemorrhage in 1926 after she was found unconscious in her Chelsea studio, apparently after visiting China, and using toxic products to dye her hair.

Behenna's miniature portraits from the Peter Marié Collection are kept at the New-York Historical Society.
