= Frederic Bronson =

American lawyer (1851–1900)

- Born: July 20, 1851; New York City, New York, U.S.
- Died: March 29, 1900 (aged 61); Palermo, Italy
- Resting place: Oak Lawn Cemetery; Fairfield, Connecticut, U.S.
- Education: Columbia College; Columbia Law School
- Spouse: Sarah Gracie King (m. 1875–1900)
- Children: Elizabeth Duer Bronson
- Parent(s): Frederic Bronson; Charlotte Brinckerhoff
- Relatives: Isaac Bronson (grandfather)

Frederic D. Bronson, Jr. (July 20, 1851 – March 29, 1900) was a prominent American lawyer during the Gilded Age in New York City.

== Early life ==
Bronson was born on July 20, 1851, in New York City. He was the son of Frederic Bronson (1802–1868) and Charlotte (née Brinckerhoff) Bronson (1818–1861). He was the brother of Charlotte Troup Bronson, who married Egerton Leigh Winthrop, Louisa Bronson, who married H. H. Hunnewell Jr. the son of Paris and Boston merchant banker Horatio Hollis Hunnewell, and Maria Bronson.

He was the paternal grandson of Isaac Bronson, and a member of the extended Bronson family, which was prominent in business and society, including his uncle, Dr. Oliver Bronson. His maternal grandparents were James Lefferts Brinckerhoff and Charlotte (née Troup) Brinckerhoff, daughter of Lt. Col. Robert Troup and Jannetje (née Goelet) Troup. His aunt Maria Lousia Brinckerhoff (1816–1866), was married to Robert Livingston Pell (1811–1880), a grandson of James Duane.

== Career ==
Morris graduated from Columbia College in 1870, and later, Columbia Law School, in 1873.

He was a director of the Savings Bank for Merchants' Clerks and the treasurer of the New York Life and Trust Company, which was founded by his grandfather, Isaac Bronson. He also served as a trustee of Columbia University from 1896 until his death in 1900. From his election in 1893 until his death, he was a manager of the Society for the Reformation of Juvenile Delinquents in the City of New York.

=== Society life ===
In 1892, Bronson and his wife were both included in Ward McAllister's "Four Hundred", purported to be an index of New York's best families, published in The New York Times.

He served as the president of the New York Coaching Club, trustee of the City Club, vice-president of the Union Club in 1898. He was also a member of the Knickerbocker Club, Racquet and Tennis Club, Country Club, Metropolitan Club, Down Town Club, Riding Club, Church Club, and New York Yacht Club.

== Personal life ==
In 1875, he was married to Sarah Gracie King (1850–1931). She was the daughter of Archibald Gracie King and Elizabeth Denning (née Duer) King, and the granddaughter of U.S. Representative James Gore King and William Alexander Duer. She was also the sister of May Denning King, who married John King Van Rensselaer, son of Henry Bell Van Rensselaer and grandson of Stephen Van Rensselaer III, the patroon of Rensselaerwyck. Her brother, Frederick Gore King (b. 1852), was the father of Alice Gore King. The Bronsons lived at 174 Madison Avenue and had a country home, "Verna" in Southport, Connecticut (which later became the Fairfield Country Day School). Together, they were the parents of:

- Elizabeth Duer Bronson (1877–1914), who married Lloyd Carpenter Griscom (1872–1959), the United States Ambassador to Italy who was a son of Clement Griscom, the shipping magnate, in 1901. After her death in 1914, he remarried to Audrey M.E. Crosse in 1929.

Bronson died of pneumonia in Palermo, Italy on March 29, 1900, after completing a Mediterranean voyage on Augusta Victoria, a luxury ship owned by North German Lloyd. His funeral was held at Grace Church in Manhattan, officiated by Bishop Henry C. Potter and he was buried at Oak Lawn Cemetery in Connecticut. The honorary pallbearers at his funeral were Frank Knight Sturgis, Adrian Iselin, Jr., Dr. Francis Delafield, W. Bayard Cutting, George L. Rives, Johnston Livingston, A. J. Cassatt, Charles Gould, John Nish, and F. Delano Weeks.

His widow, then 63, remarried in 1914 to his friend, Adrian Iselin, the banker who was then 67. She died in 1931.
