= N.Y.D. Company =

Railroad manufacturer in New York, USA

The N.Y.D. Company was a railroad manufacturer that laid rails in the New York and Brooklyn docks. The company's parent company is New York Dock Company, operated circa 1900 and installed rails at various dock sites on the US East coast
