= Columbus O'Donnell Iselin =

American oceanographer (1904–1971)

- Born: Columbus O'Donnell Iselin II; September 25, 1904; New Rochelle, New York
- Died: January 5, 1971 (aged 66); Falmouth, Massachusetts
- Education: St. Mark's School
- Alma mater: Harvard University
- Spouse: Eleanor Emmet Lapsley
- Children: 2 sons, 3 daughters
- Relatives: Charles Oliver Iselin (uncle)

Columbus O'Donnell Iselin (1904–1971) was an American oceanographer. He was the director of the Woods Hole Oceanographic Institution from 1940 to 1950, and from 1956 to 1960. He was Professor of Physical Oceanography at Harvard University and the Massachusetts Institute of Technology (MIT).

== Early life ==
Columbus O'Donnell Iselin was born on September 25, 1904, in New Rochelle, New York. His great-great-great-grandfather, Isaac Iselin, moved from Basel, Switzerland to the United States in 1801. His family were long-time members of the New York Yacht Club and his uncle, Charles Oliver Iselin, competed in the America's Cup.

He was educated at St. Mark's School, an Episcopal private boarding school in Southborough, Massachusetts, from 1917 to 1922. He graduated with a Bachelor of Arts degree in 1926 and a masters of arts degree in 1928 from Harvard University, where Henry Bryant Bigelow was one of his professors.

== Career ==
Iselin was an oceanographer. He served as the Assistant Curator of Oceanography at Harvard University's Museum of Comparative Zoology from 1929 to 1948. He served as physical oceanographer at the Woods Hole Oceanographic Institution from 1932 to 1940, and as its Director from 1940 to 1950, and again from 1956 to 1960. During his tenure, he significantly expanded the institute, at least tenfold.

Iselin taught at the Massachusetts Institute of Technology (MIT) in 1936. He went on to teach at Harvard University, where he was assistant professor of oceanography from 1936 to 1939, Associate Professor of Physical Oceanography from 1939 to 1960, and full Professor of Physical Oceanography in 1960. He also became full Professor of Oceanography at MIT in 1959.

Iselin was a member of the American Geophysical Union, the American Academy of Arts and Sciences, the American Philosophical Society, the National Academy of Sciences, the Scientific Committee on Oceanic Research, etc. He served on the board of trustees of the Bermuda Biological Station for Research, the Marine Biological Laboratory, and the American Museum of Natural History. He was a Fellow of the New York Academy of Sciences. He joined the Council of the American Geographical Society in 1963.

Iselin was the recipient of the Alexander Agassiz Medal in 1942. He received an honorary doctorate of science from Brown University in 1947. Additionally, he was the recipient of the Medal for Merit from President Harry Truman in 1948.

== Boating ==
Iselin was the owner of a schooner called Chance. In the summertime, he sailed it off the Canadian coast of Newfoundland and Labrador, going up to Cape Chidley.

In 1926, Columbus O'Donnell Iselin led an expedition aboard the schooner "Chance" that combined maritime exploration with scientific research along the coasts of Newfoundland and Labrador to Cape Chidley. The expedition collected botanical specimens, sampled plankton, and conducted hydrographic stations perpendicular to the coast. Iselin later documented the voyage and its findings in a private publication titled "The Log of the Schooner Chance."

== Personal life ==
Iselin married Eleanor Emmet Lapsley, daughter of John Willard Lapsley and his wife Eleanor Temple Emmet, on 19 January 1929 at St. Matthew's Church, Bedford Village, New York. They had two sons and three daughters.

Iselin died on January 5, 1971, in Falmouth, Massachusetts. His funeral took place in Vineyard Haven, Massachusetts on Martha's Vineyard.
