= Fernand Paillet =

French painter

- Born: 1850; Niort, France
- Died: 1918 (aged 67–68)

Fernand Paillet (1850–1918) was a French figurine artist, miniature portraitist and jewelry designer. He painted many American socialites of the Gilded Age.

== Early life ==
Fernand Paillet was born in 1850 in Niort, France. He was trained by Albert-Ernest Carrier-Belleuse.

== Career ==
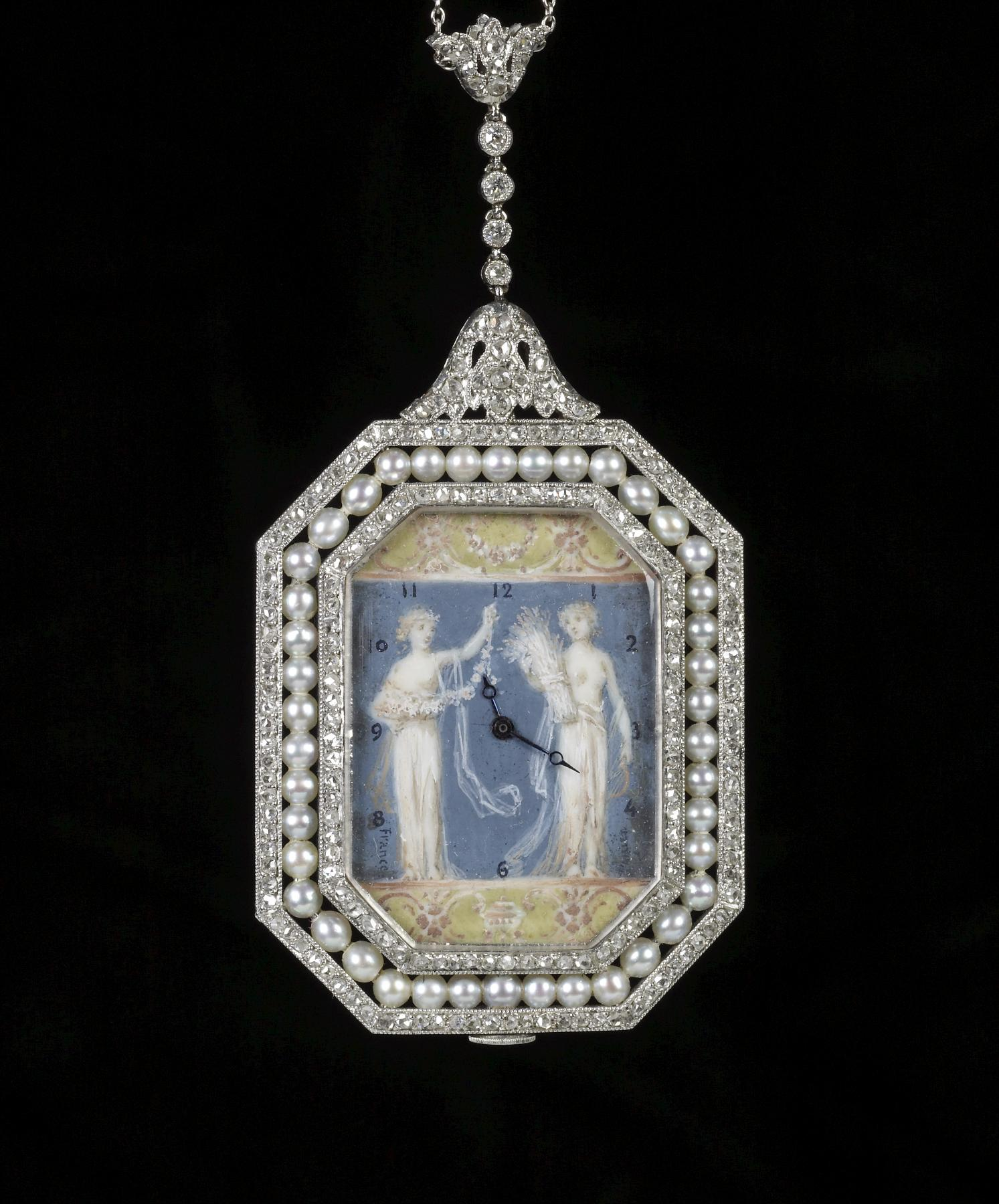
Pendant designed by Paillet for Marcus & Co.

Paillet established a studio in Paris. He became renowned for his figurines, made with ivory and ceramic.

He painted portraits of American socialites of the Gilded Age, including miniatures for the Peter Marié collection, now preserved by the New-York Historical Society. He did a miniature portrait of Edith Wharton.

Paillet also designed jewelry. A pendant he designed for Marcus & Co., a luxury jewelry retailer, is exhibited at the Walters Art Museum in Baltimore, Maryland.

== Death ==
He died in 1918.
