= Adrian Mines, Pennsylvania =

Unincorporated community in Pennsylvania, US

- Unincorporated community
- Location within Pennsylvania
- Coordinates: 40°59′05″N 78°57′37″W
- Country: United States
- State: Pennsylvania
- County: Jefferson
- Township: Young
- Elevation: 1,430 ft (440 m)
- Time zone: UTC-5 (Eastern (EST))
  - Summer (DST): UTC-4 (EDT)
- GNIS feature ID: 1213082

Adrian Mines (also called Adrian and De Lancey) is an unincorporated community in Jefferson County, in the U.S. state of Pennsylvania.

== History ==
Adrian Mines was founded around 1887 as a mining community. The community was named for its proprietor, Adrian Iselin. The post office at Adrian Mines is called De Lancey. This post office has been in operation since 1888.
