= Hope Goddard Iselin =

American sportswoman

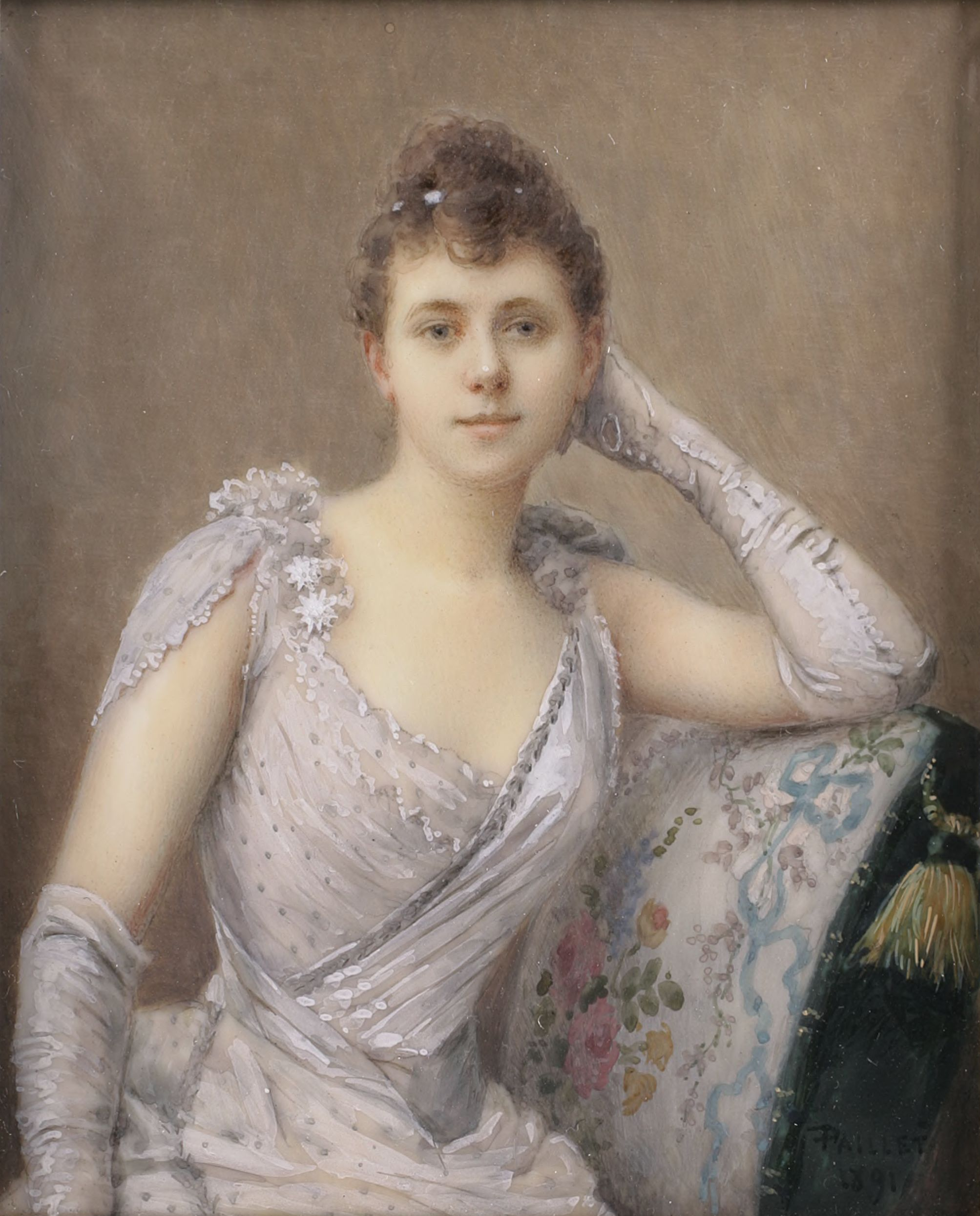
- Miniature portrait by Fernand Paillet (1891)
- Born: January 17, 1868; Providence, Rhode Island
- Died: April 5, 1970 (aged 102); Aiken, South Carolina
- Resting place: Woodlawn Cemetery; Bronx, New York
- Occupation(s): Yachtswoman, racehorse owner, philanthropist, social leader
- Spouse: C. Oliver Iselin (m. 1894; died 1932)
- Children: William Goddard Iselin (1903-1909); Edith Hope Iselin Jones (1905-2001)
- Parent(s): Colonel William Goodard; Mary Edith Jenckes Goddard

Edith Hope Goddard Iselin (January 17, 1868 – April 5, 1970) was an American heiress and sportswoman who was the first American woman to compete as a crew member in the America's Cup yacht race. She also owned thoroughbred racehorses.

Hope Goddard was the daughter of Mary Edith (née Jenckes) Goddard (1844–1921) and Colonel William Goddard (1825–1907) of Providence, Rhode Island, a chancellor of Brown University and a scion of a family that had accumulated great wealth from mercantile and manufacturing activities. In 1894, she married Charles Oliver Iselin, a banker and sportsman who was described by Time magazine as "probably the most famed yachtsman in the U.S." during the latter part of the 19th Century. The headline of their wedding announcement in the New York Times read, "Hope Goddard Engaged to C.O. Iselin, Well-Known Yachtsman to Marry Heiress of millions." Oliver Iselin was himself already a millionaire at the age of 40, made wealthy by his grandfather's investments in coal mining and railroads. The couple had a son, William Goddard Iselin (1903–1909), who died in childhood, and a daughter, Edith Hope Iselin (1905–2001), who married Archer G. Jones.

The Iselins owned many homes, including their primary residence in New Rochelle, New York, "All View", a palatial waterfront estate on a private peninsula overlooking Long Island Sound. The home was designed by architect Stanford White and the grounds by landscape architect Fredrick Law Olmsted. A breakwater was constructed adjacent to Premium Point in Echo Bay so that they could dock their yachts, the Vigilant, the Defender, and the Columbia, safely next to their home. They were influential in bringing the popularity of yacht racing to the communities on the shore of the Long Island Sound in Westchester County, making New Rochelle a focal point of racing activity.

Iselin and her husband were noted for their philanthropy. In Aiken, South Carolina, where they maintained a winter residence named "Hopelands", they organized the Aiken Hospital and Relief Society, which built and equipped Aiken's first hospital in 1917. They continued to support the hospital until it was replaced by the county hospital in 1937. Iselin also served for many years as a director of the Martha Schofield School for the education of young African-Americans. On her death she bequeathed Hopelands Gardens, where the Aiken Thoroughbred Racing Hall of Fame and Museum is located, to the city of Aiken. A bust of Iselin at Hopeland Gardens was sculpted by Maria Kirby Smith.

Iselin died in her home in Aiken, South Carolina in 1970 at the age of 102.
