= C. Oliver Iselin =

American banker & yachtsman (1854–1932)

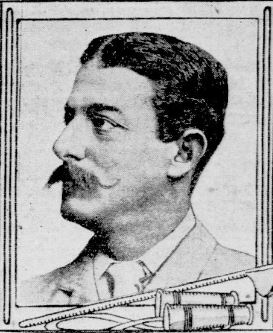
- Born: June 8, 1854; New York City, New York, U.S.
- Died: January 1, 1932 (aged 77); Glen Head, New York, U.S.
- Resting place: Woodlawn Cemetery; Woodlawn, Bronx, New York
- Education: Columbia Law School
- Occupations: Banker, yachtsman, philanthropist
- Spouses: Fannie Garner (m. 1872; died 1890) Hope Goddard (m. 1894)
- Children: Countess Eleanora (Nora) Iselin von Colloredo-Mannsfield (1881-1939); Fannie Garner Iselin Livermore (1883-1973); Adrian Iselin II (1885-1961); C. Oliver Iselin Jr. (1890-1979); William Goddard Iselin (1903-1909); Edith Hope Iselin Jones (1905-2001)
- Parent(s): Adrian Georg Iselin; Eleanora O'Donnell Iselin
- Relatives: Adrian Iselin Jr. (brother); Columbus O'Donnell (grandfather)
- Awards: America's Cup Hall of Fame (1994)

Charles Oliver Iselin (June 8, 1854 – January 1, 1932) was an American banker and yachtsman who was captain of racing yachts that won the America's Cup three times.

== Early life ==
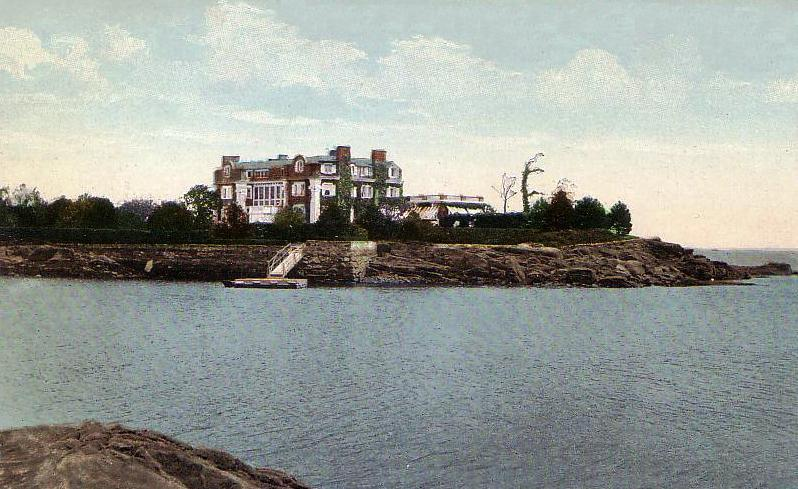
Iselin's estate home "All View" on Premium Point, New Rochelle, New York

Iselin was the son of Adrian Georg Iselin and Eleanora O Donnell Iselin. Eleanora O'Donnell was the great granddaughter of Columbus O'Donnell. His great-great-grandfather Isaac Iselin-Roulet came to America in 1801 from Basel, Switzerland, where the Iselin's had been merchants, public officials, and military and professional men since the 14th century. Isaac amassed a large fortune in the importing business, and his descendants became private bankers and philanthropists in New York City and New Rochelle, New York.

=== Education ===
He was educated at Columbia University, graduating in 1874 with a LL.B.

=== Yachting ===
Oliver was considered to be one of the greatest American yachtsmen of his time, participating in and winning six consecutive America's Cup races: 1887, 1893, 1895, 1899, 1901 and 1903. He built a large breakwater next to his Premium Point, New Rochelle estate All View so that he could dock his yachts Defender, Reliance and Columbia safely at home. In 1994 Oliver Iselin was inducted into the Herreshoff Marine Museum's America's Cup Hall of Fame.

== Personal life ==
Iselin was first married to Frances (Fannie) Margaretta Garner (1861–1890) with whom he had four children including a son, C. Oliver Jr. (1890–1979), who named his son, C. Oliver III (1927–2017). After her death, he married Hope Goddard (1868–1970), who was the first woman ever to serve as part of the crew on an America's Cup yacht, in 1894.

Iselin died on January 1, 1932, at Glen Head on Long Island.

== Gallery ==
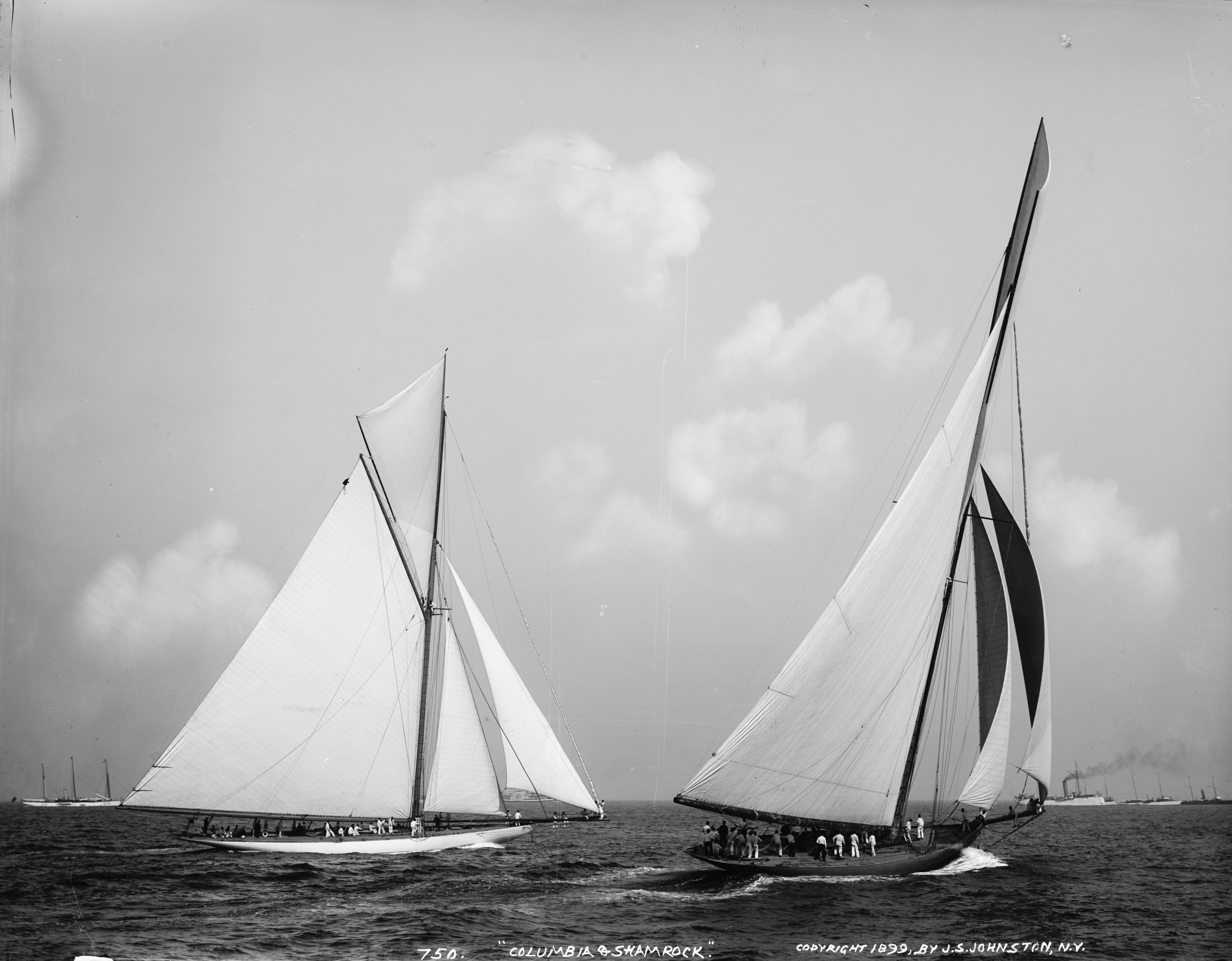
Columbia

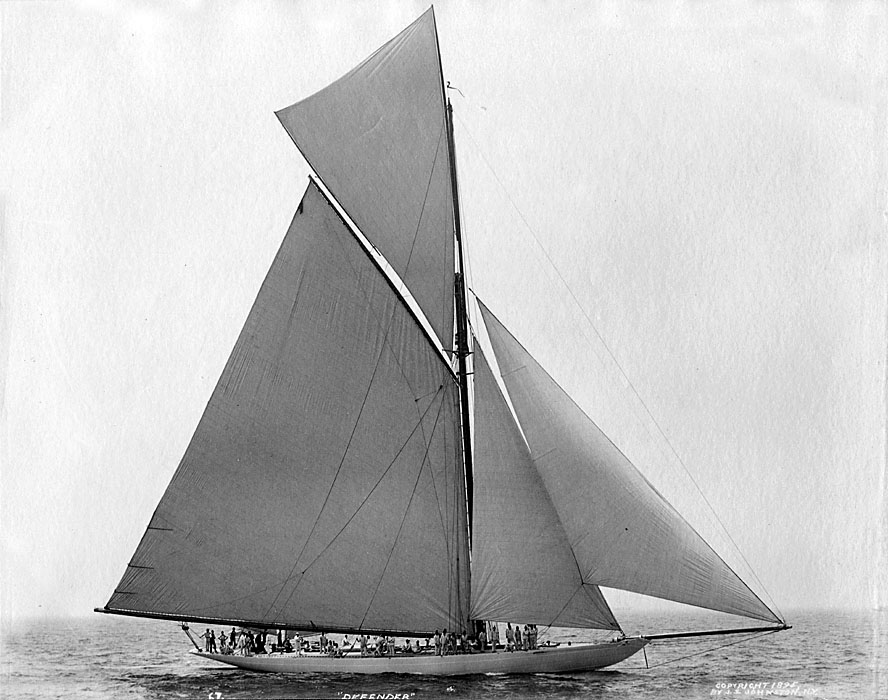
Defender

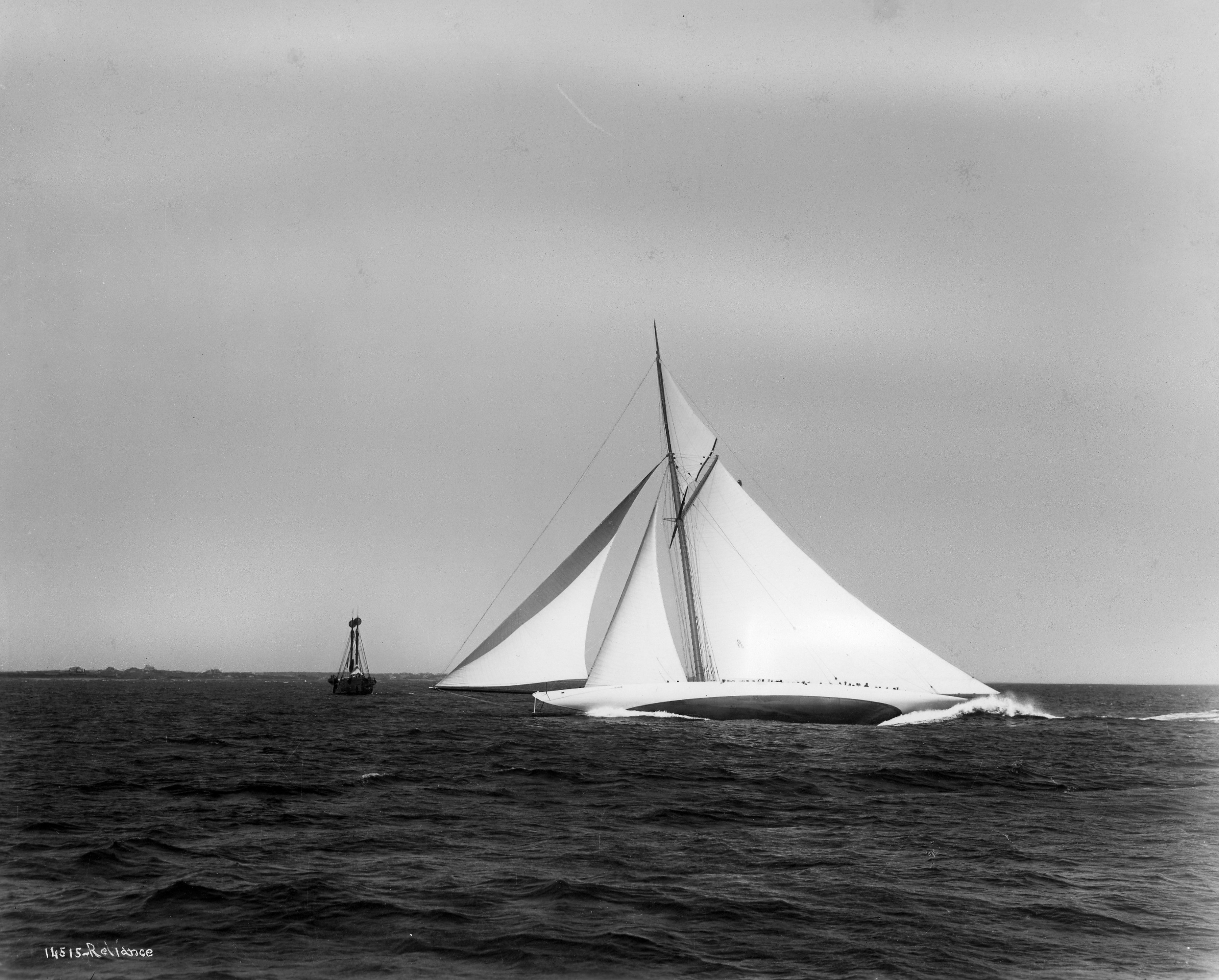
Reliance
