= Figurine =

Small item resembling something, usually a person

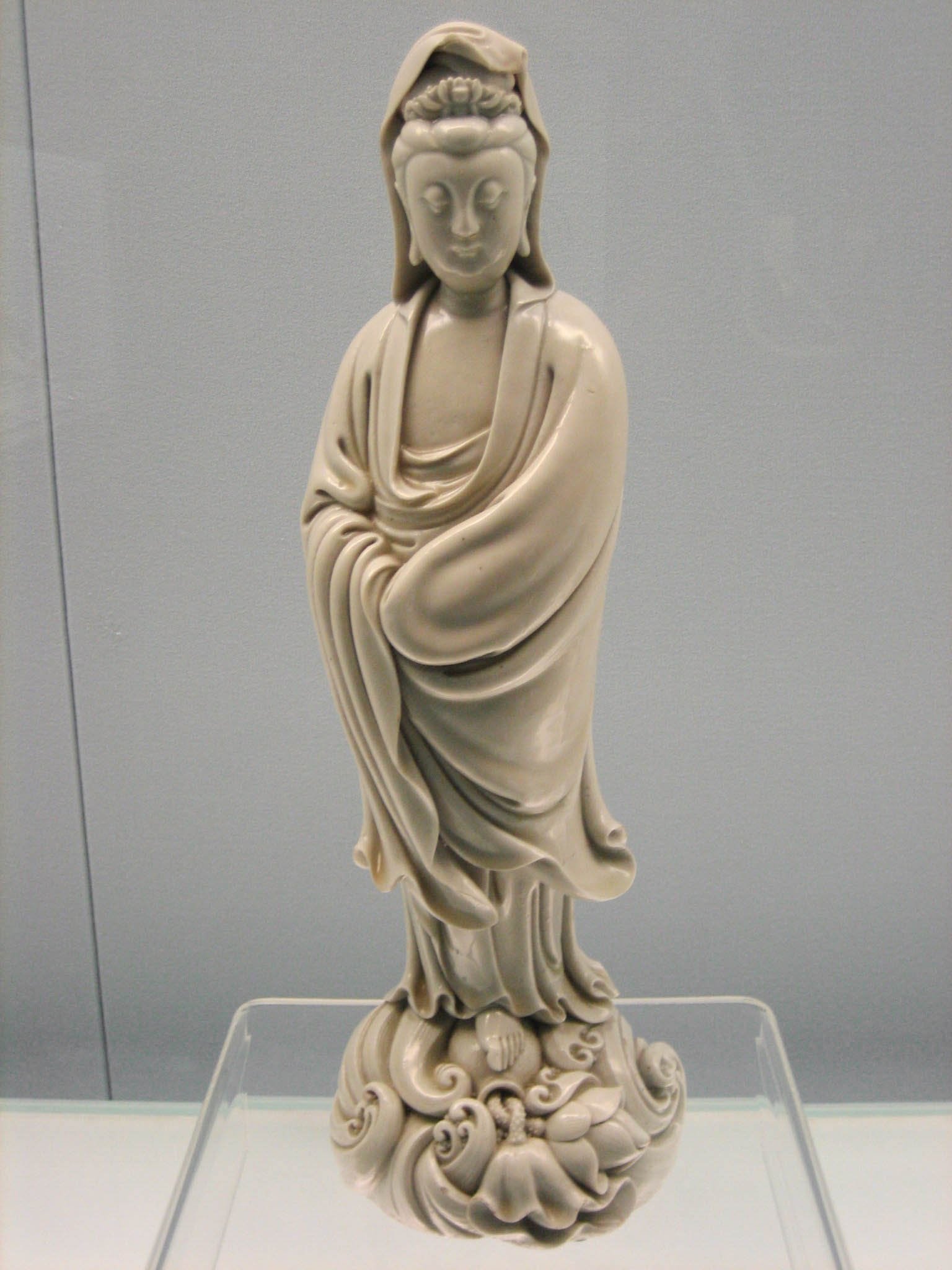
Chinese porcelain blanc de Chine figure of Guanyin, Ming dynasty

A figurine (a diminutive form of the word figure) or statuette is a small, three-dimensional sculpture that represents a human, deity or animal, or, in practice, a pair or small group of them. Figurines have been made in many media, with clay, metal, wood, glass, and today plastic or resin the most significant. Ceramic figurines not made of porcelain are called terracottas in historical contexts.

Figures with movable parts, allowing limbs to be posed, are more likely to be called dolls, mannequins, or action figures; or robots or automata, if they can move on their own. Figurines and miniatures are sometimes used in board games, such as chess, and tabletop role playing games.

The main difference between a figurine and a statue is size. There is no agreed limit, but typically objects are called "figurines" up to a height of perhaps two feet (60 cm), though most types are less than one foot (30 cm) high.

== Prehistory ==
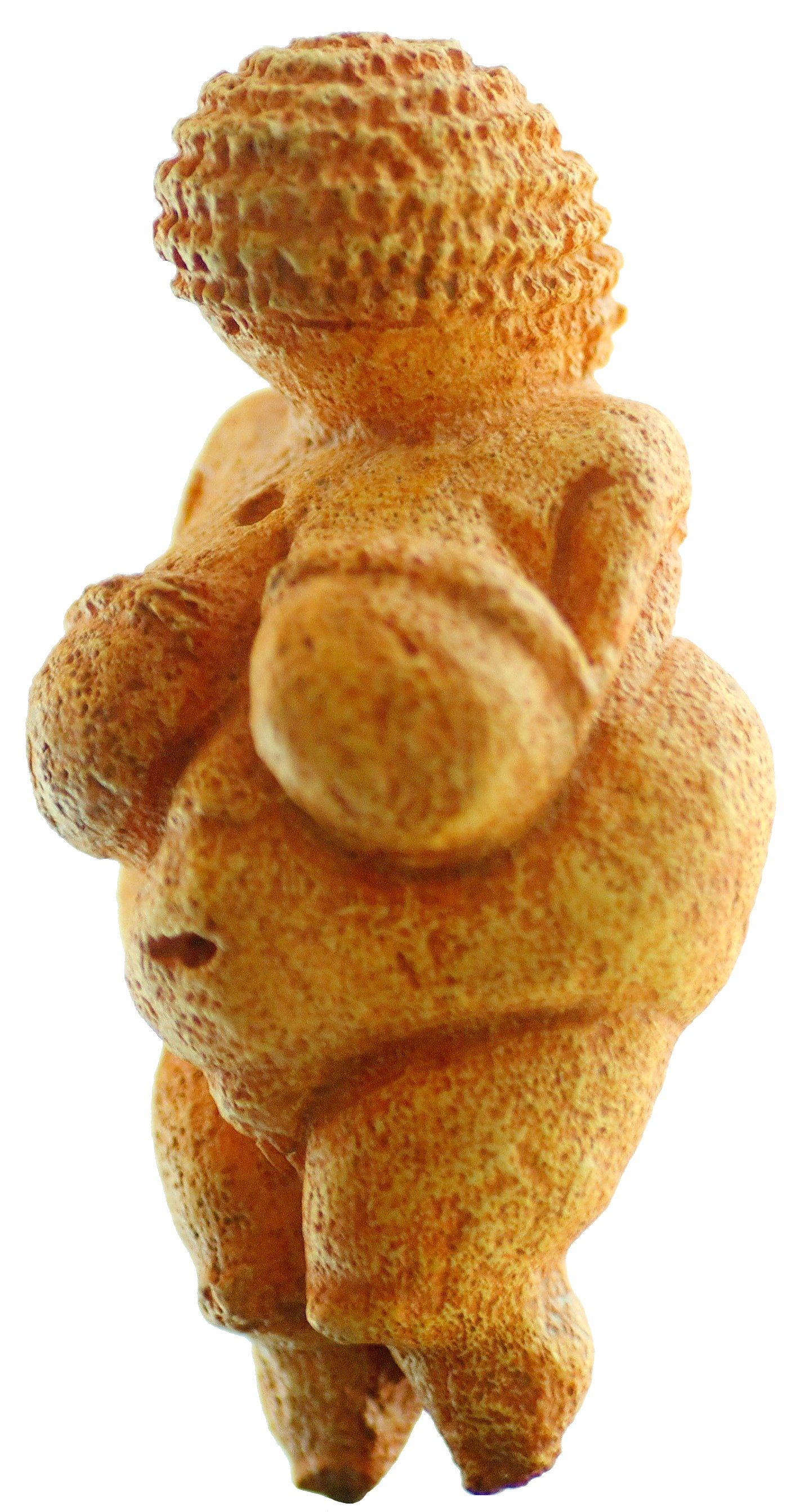
Prehistoric Venus of Willendorf figurine

In China, there are extant Neolithic figurines.

European prehistoric figurines of women, some appearing pregnant, are called Venus figurines, because of their presumed connection to fertility. The two oldest known examples are made of stone, were found in Africa and Asia, and are several hundred thousand years old. Many made of fired clay have been found in Europe that date to 25–30,000 BC, and are the oldest ceramics known.

Olmec figurines in semi-precious stones and pottery had a wide influence all over Mesoamerica about 1000–500 BC, and were apparently usually kept in houses.

These early figurines are among the first signs of human culture. One cannot know in some cases how they were used. They probably had religious or ceremonial significance and may have been used in many types of rituals. Many are found in burials. Some may have been worn as jewelry or intended to amuse children.

In ancient India, particularly during the Indus Valley Civilisation (c. 3300–1300 BC), numerous terracotta figurines have been discovered at sites such as Harappa and Mohenjo-daro. These include stylized human figures, often interpreted as fertility figures, as well as a wide variety of animal figurines.

One of the most famous examples is the bronze statuette known as the Dancing Girl, which demonstrates early metalworking skill and artistic expression.

== History ==
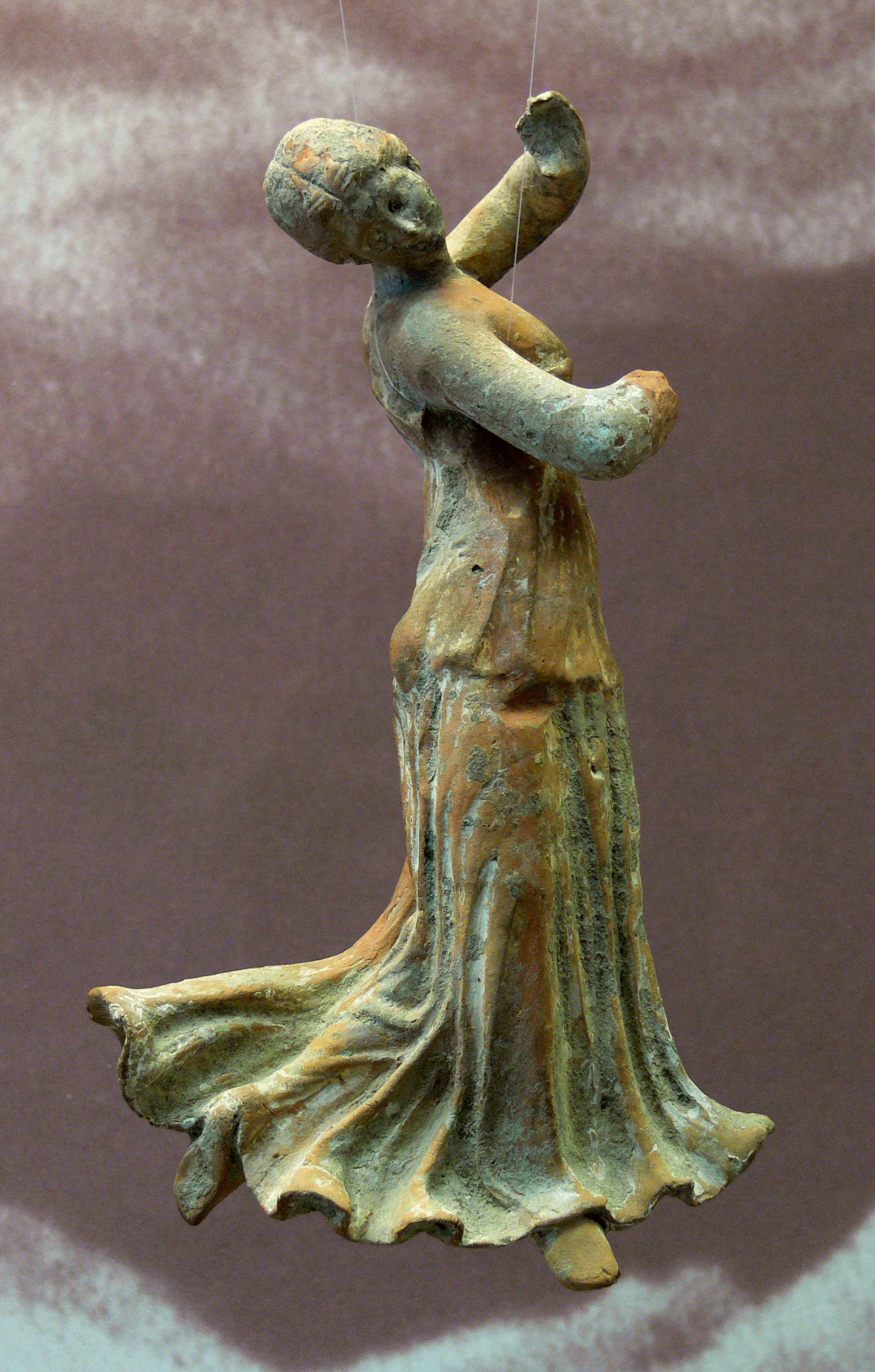
Dancing Tanagra figurine, Hellenistic terracotta, 2nd-century BC

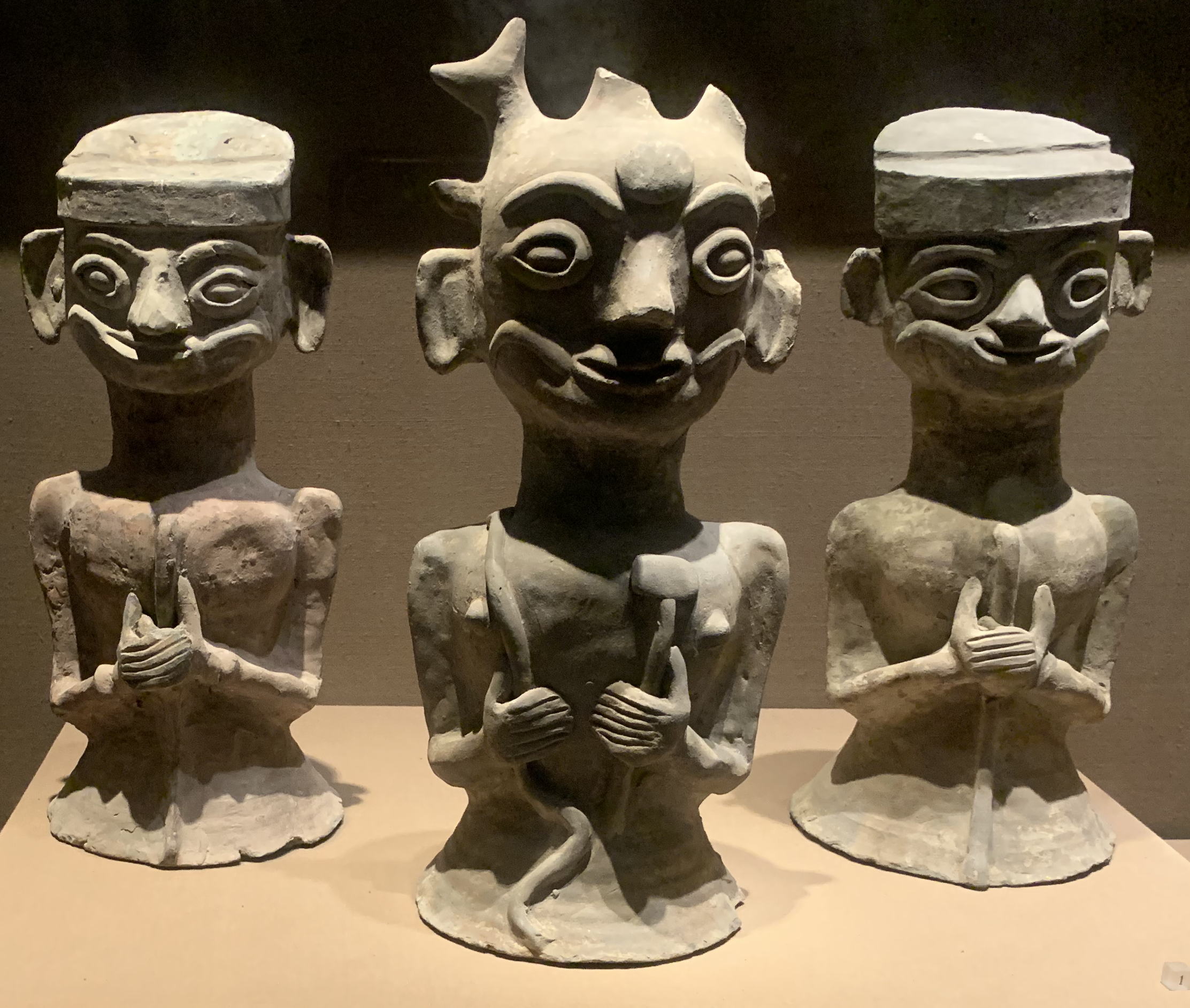
Figurines from Cheng-Han (304–347), unearthed in Chengdu, exhibited at Chengdu Museum

Porcelain and other ceramics are common materials for figurines. Ancient Greek terracotta figurines, made in moulds, were a large industry by the Hellenistic period, and ones in bronze were also very common. In Roman art, bronze came to predominate. Most of these were religious and deposited in large numbers in temples as votive offerings or kept in the home and sometimes buried with their owner. But types such as Tanagra figurines included many purely decorative subjects, such as fashionable ladies. There are many early examples from China, mainly religious figures in Dehua porcelain, which drove the experimentation in Europe to replicate the process.

The first European porcelain figurines were produced in Meissen porcelain, initially in a plain glazed white, but soon brightly painted in overglaze "enamels" and were soon produced by nearly all European porcelain factories. The initial function of these seems to have been as permanent versions of sugar sculptures, which were used to decorate tables on special occasions by European elites, but they soon found a place on mantelpieces and side tables. There was already some production of earthenware figures in English delftware and stoneware, for example, by John Dwight of the Fulham Pottery in London, and after 1720, such figures became more popular. By around 1750, pottery figures were being produced in large numbers all over Europe. Staffordshire figures were cheaper versions in earthenware, and by the late 19th century especially noted for Staffordshire dog figurines.

Genre figurines of gallant scenes, beggars, or figurines of saints are carved from pinewood in Val Gardena, South Tyrol (Italy), since the 17th century.

== Significant types ==
- Ushabti – Ancient Egypt, mostly placed in tombs
- Olmec figurine
- Psi and phi type figurine – Mycenaean Greece
- Euphrates Syrian Pillar Figurines and Horses and Riders – Iron Age
- Tanagra figurines – Hellenistic Greece
- Tang dynasty tomb figures – China, c. 620–755
- Mississippian stone statuary – c. 800–1600
- Staffordshire figures – England, 1720 to present
- Santons – Provence, France, 18th century to present
- Animal figurines
- Model figure

== Modern era ==
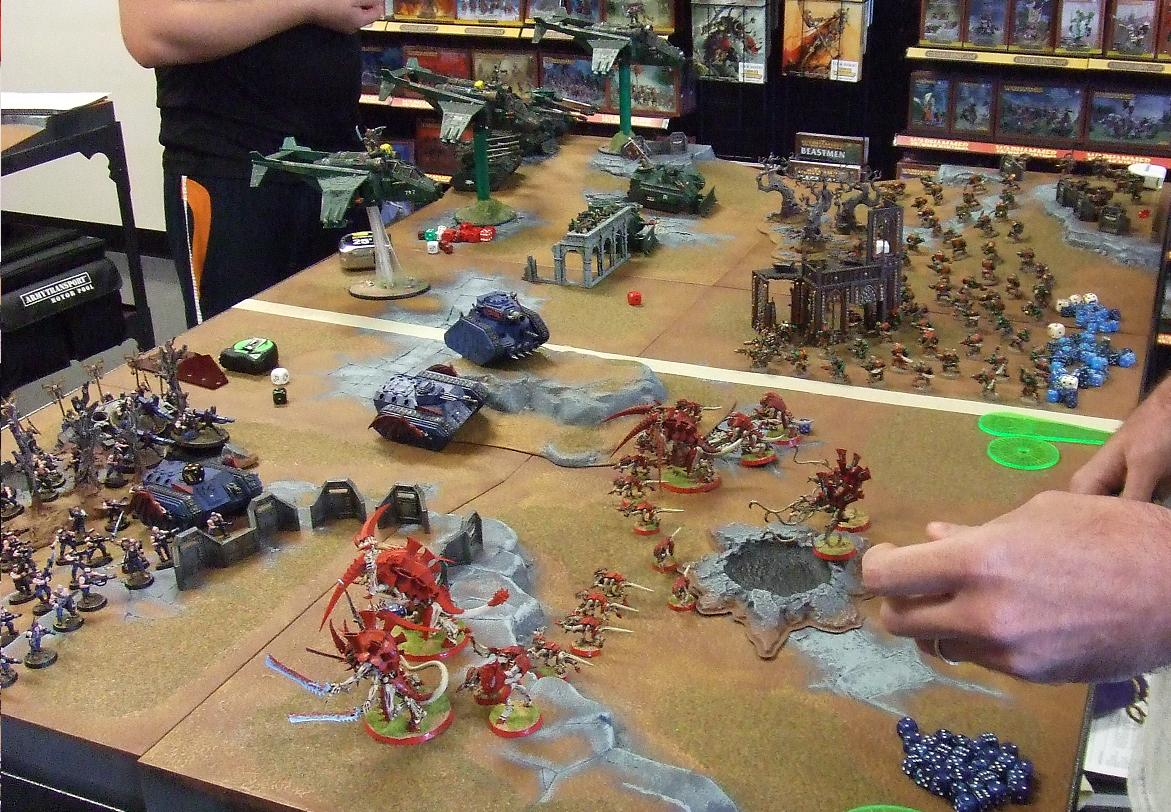
A miniature wargame

Modern figurines, particularly those made of plastic, are often referred to as figures. They can encompass modern action figures and other model figures as well as Precious Moments figurines and Hummel figurines, bobbleheads, Sebastian Miniatures and other kinds of memorabilia. Some companies which produce porcelain figurines are Royal Doulton, Lladró and Camal Enterprises.

Figurines of comic book or sci-fi/fantasy characters without movable parts have been referred to by the terms inaction figures (originally used to describe Kevin Smith's View Askew figurines) and staction figures (a portmanteau of statue and action figures coined by Four Horsemen artists to describe Masters of the Universe figures). Amiibo is a line of plastic figurines with NFC tags embedded to its base that can be used in order to interact with certain videogames for Nintendo consoles.

The miniature wargame hobby involves figurines such as toy soldiers representing armies in table top games. These figurines are mostly made of plastic and pewter, with some premium models being made of resin.

Figurines can also represent racial and ethnic slurs, for example, Jew with a coin figurines, and Mammy figurines.

== Gallery ==
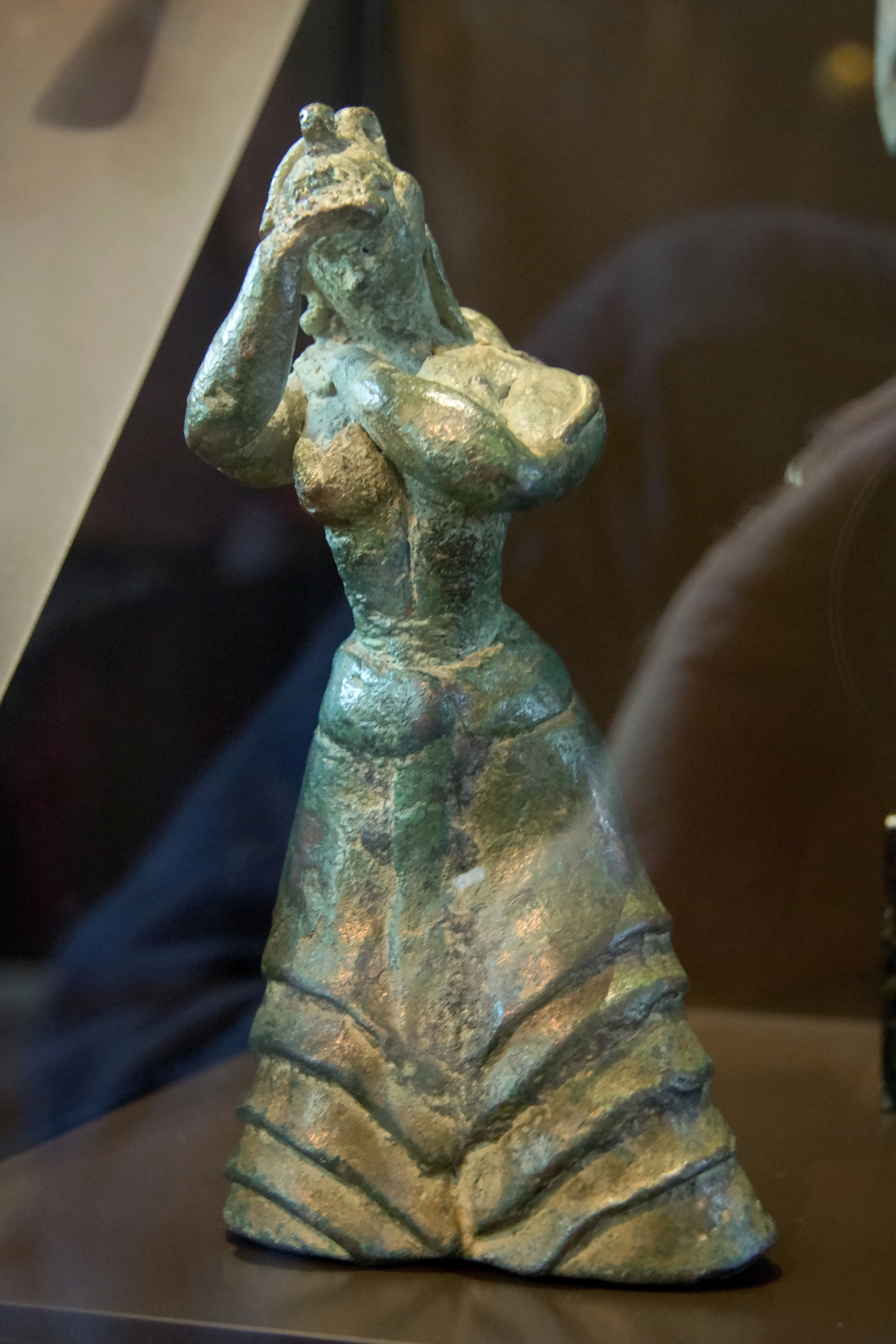
Minoan praying woman in bronze, 16th century BC

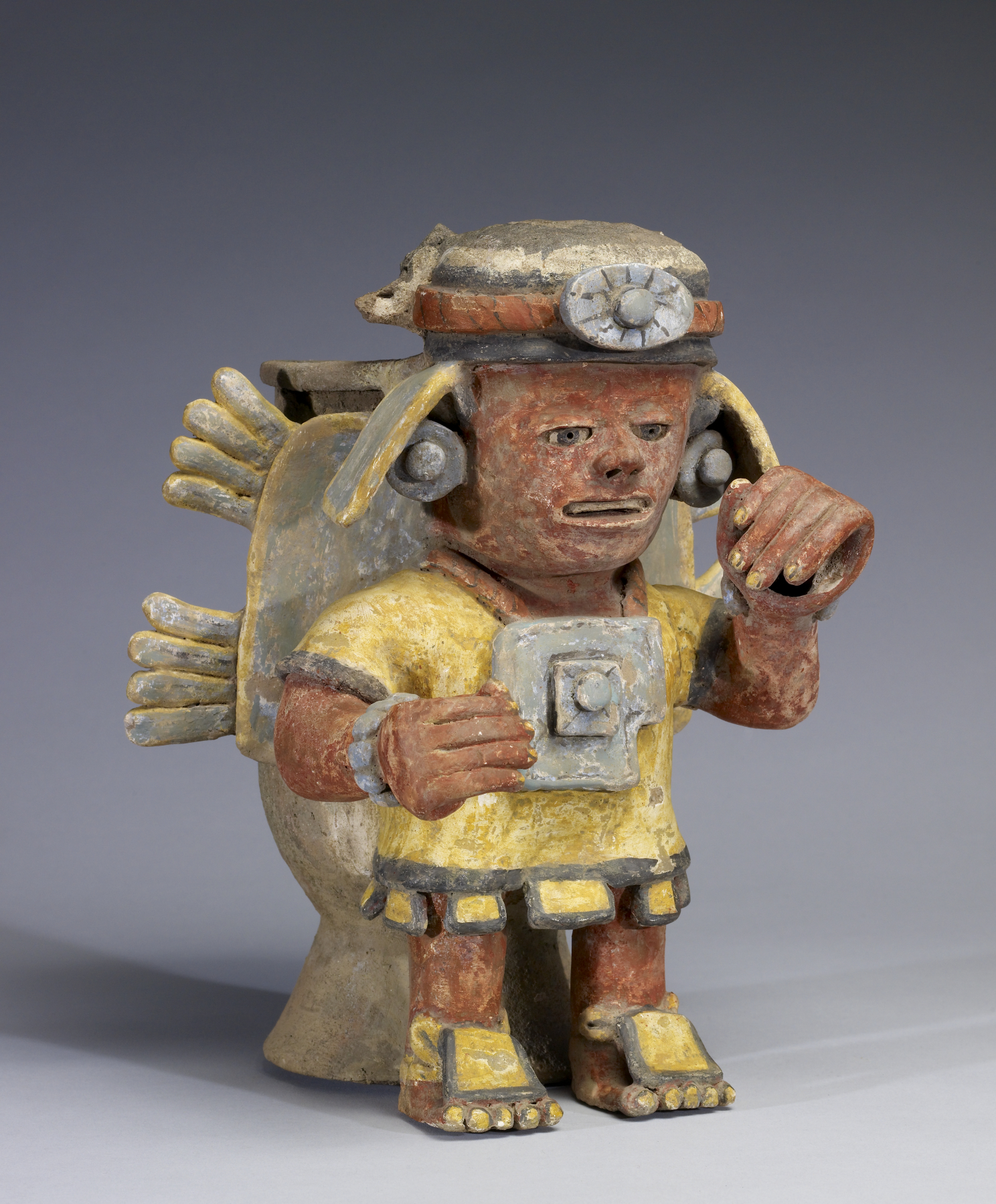
Figurine from the Mixtec culture

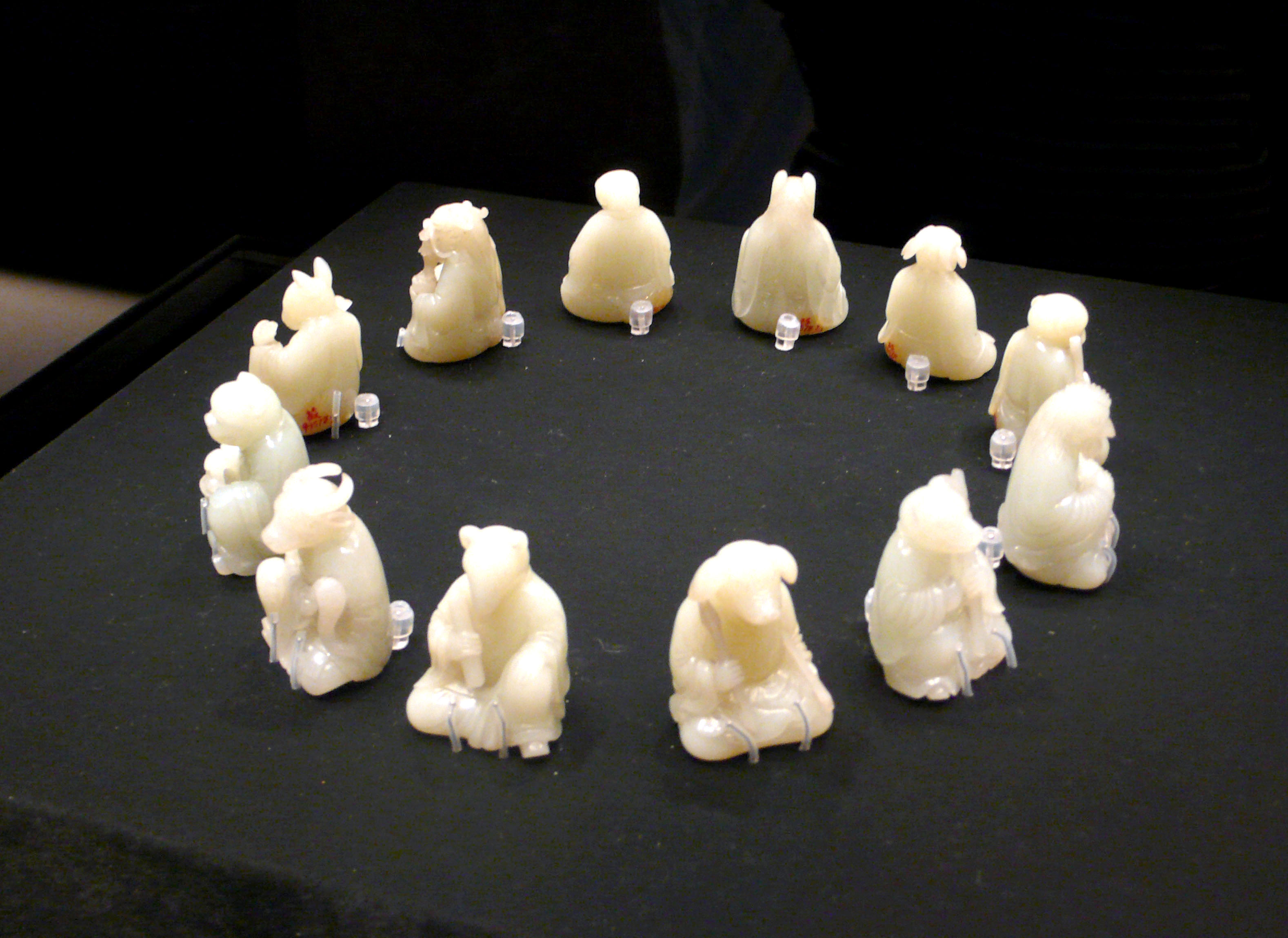
The twelve Chinese zodiac figurines

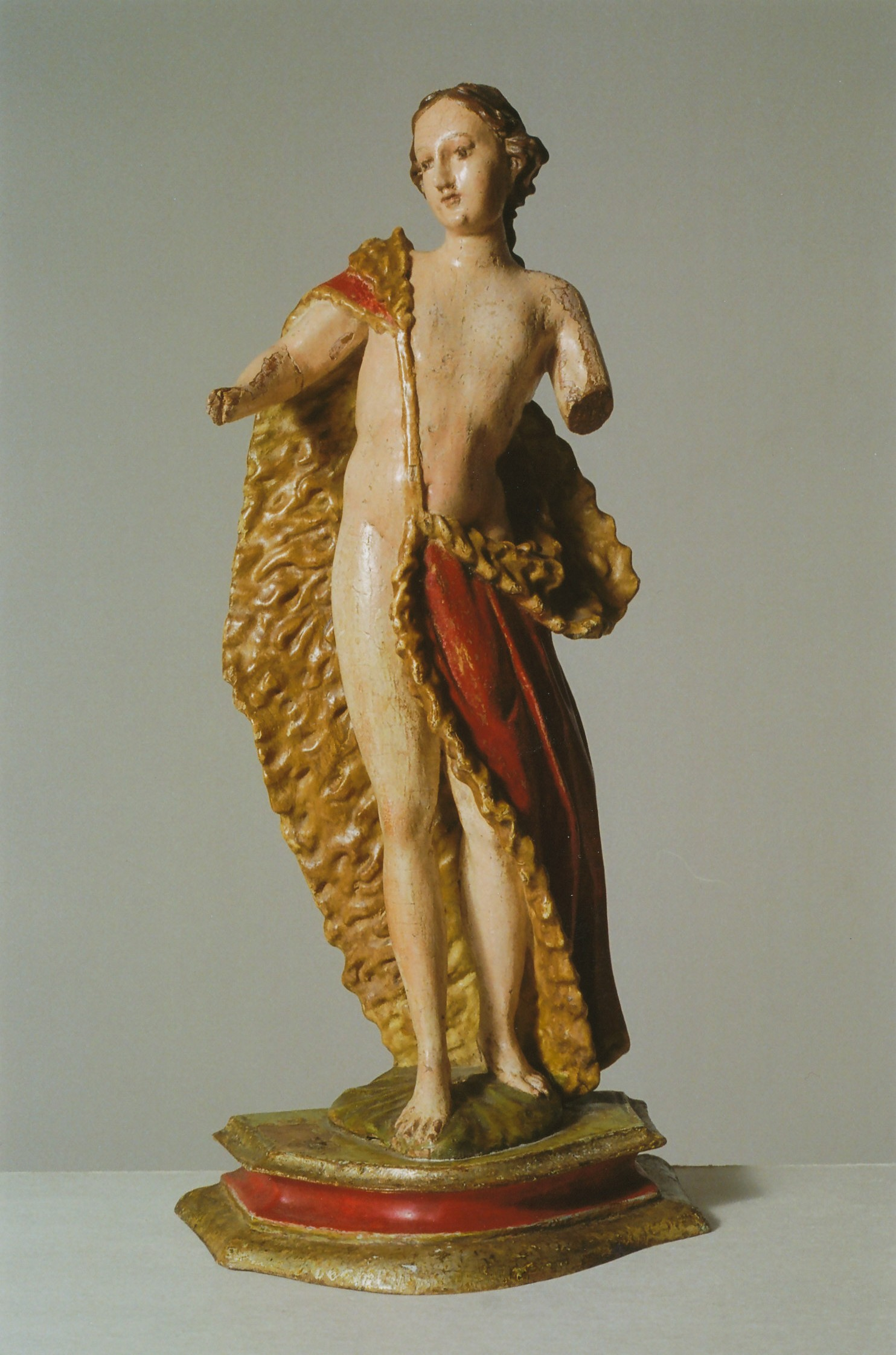
18th century Saint John Baptist pinewood polychrome figurine

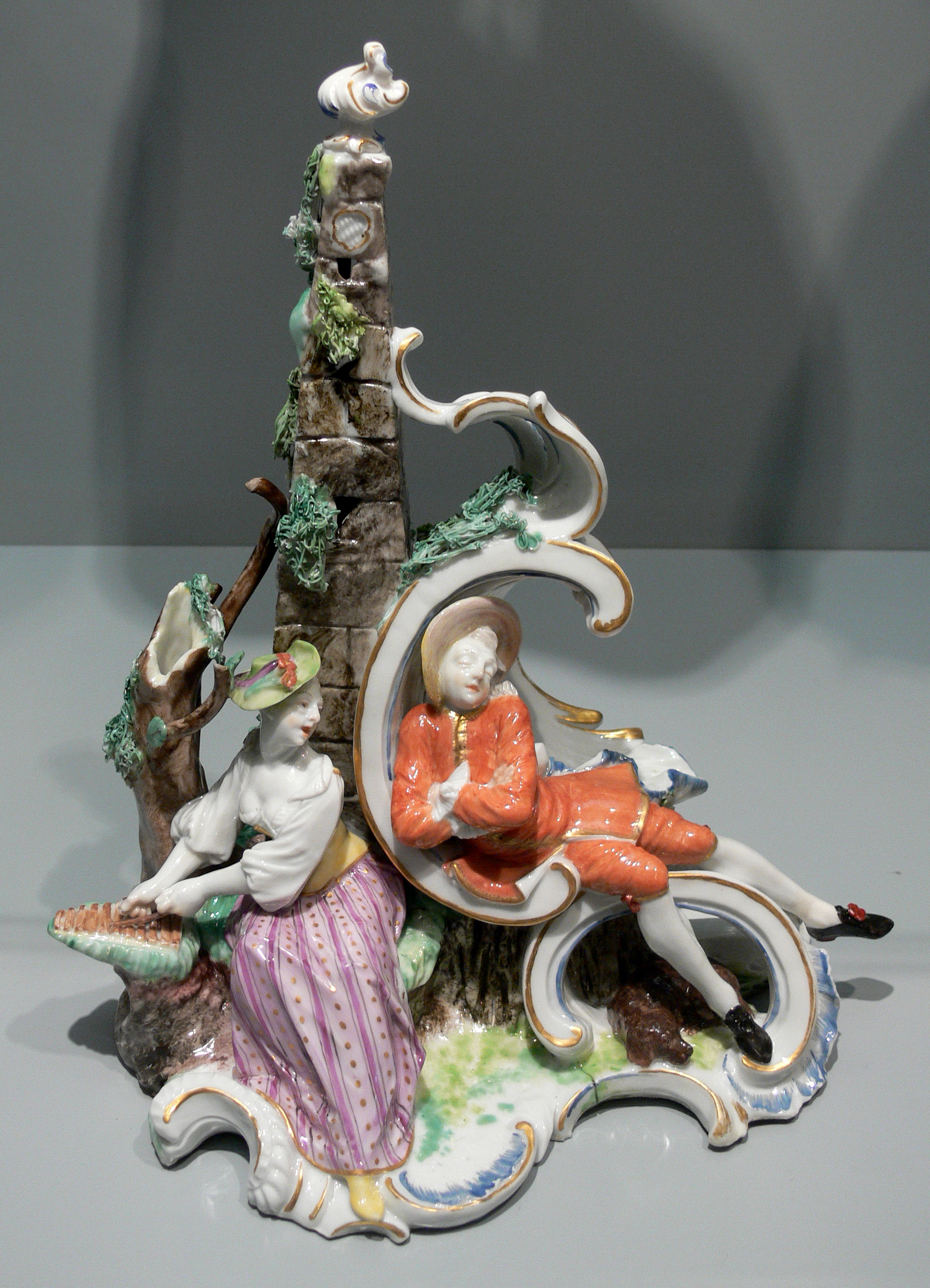
Franz Anton Bustelli, German porcelain group

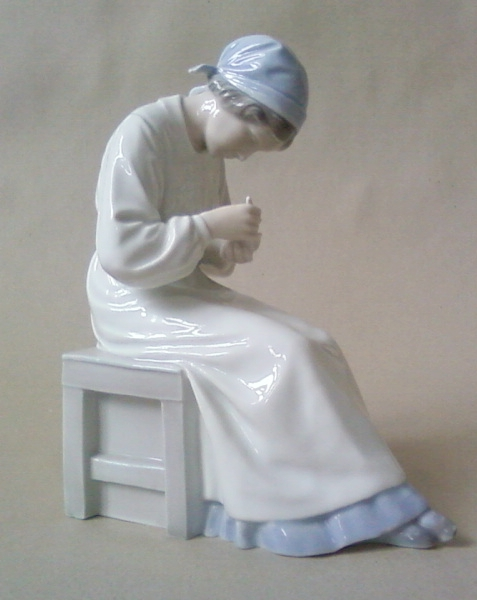
Porcelain painter, Royal Copenhagen

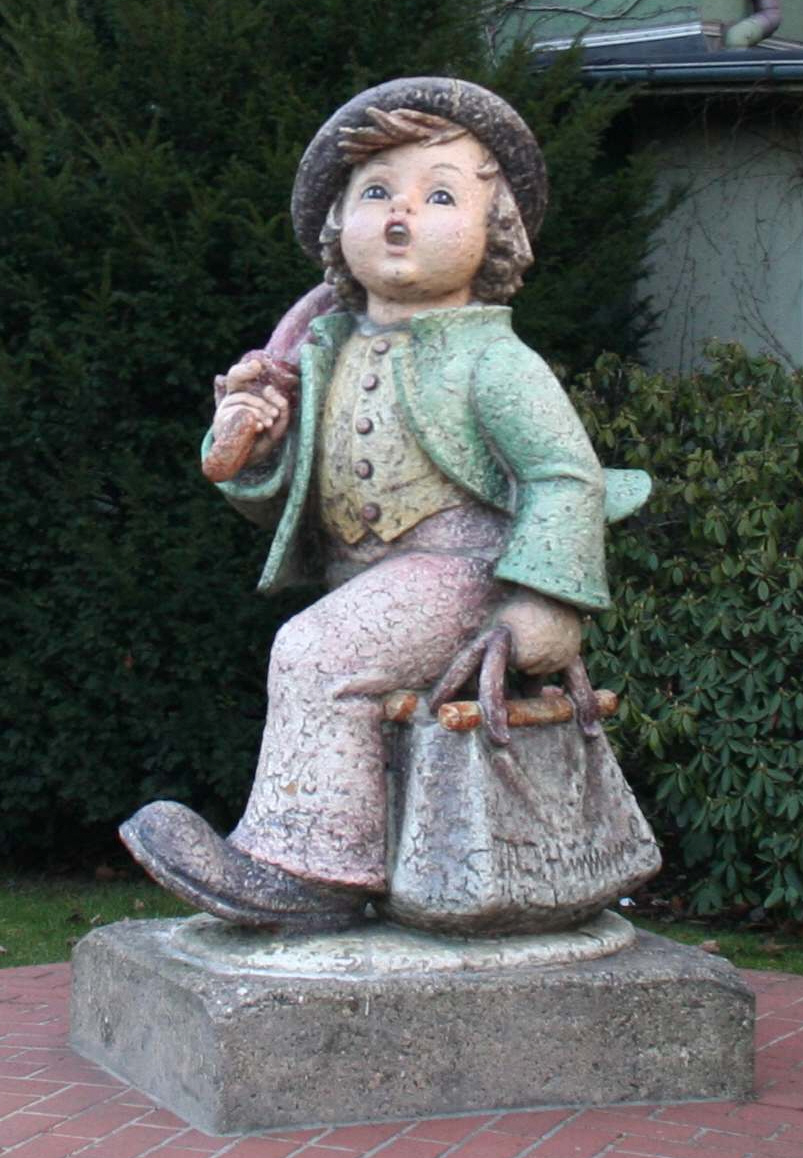
Hummel figurine

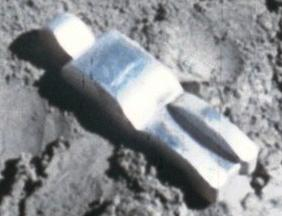
Fallen Astronaut, Moon

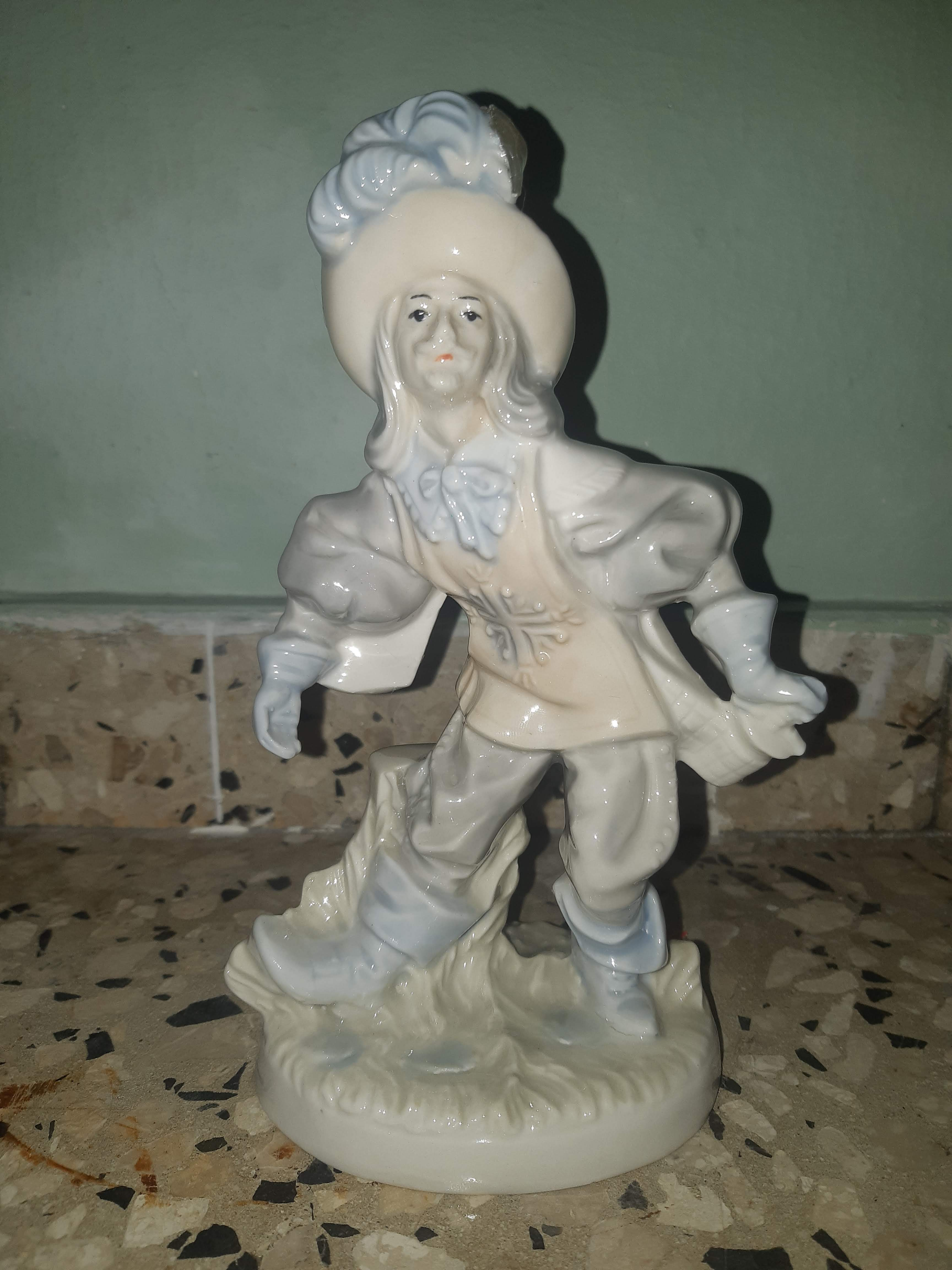
A Musketeer figurine

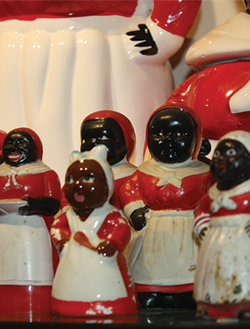
Mammy figurines in the collection of the Jim Crow Museum of Racist Memorabilia

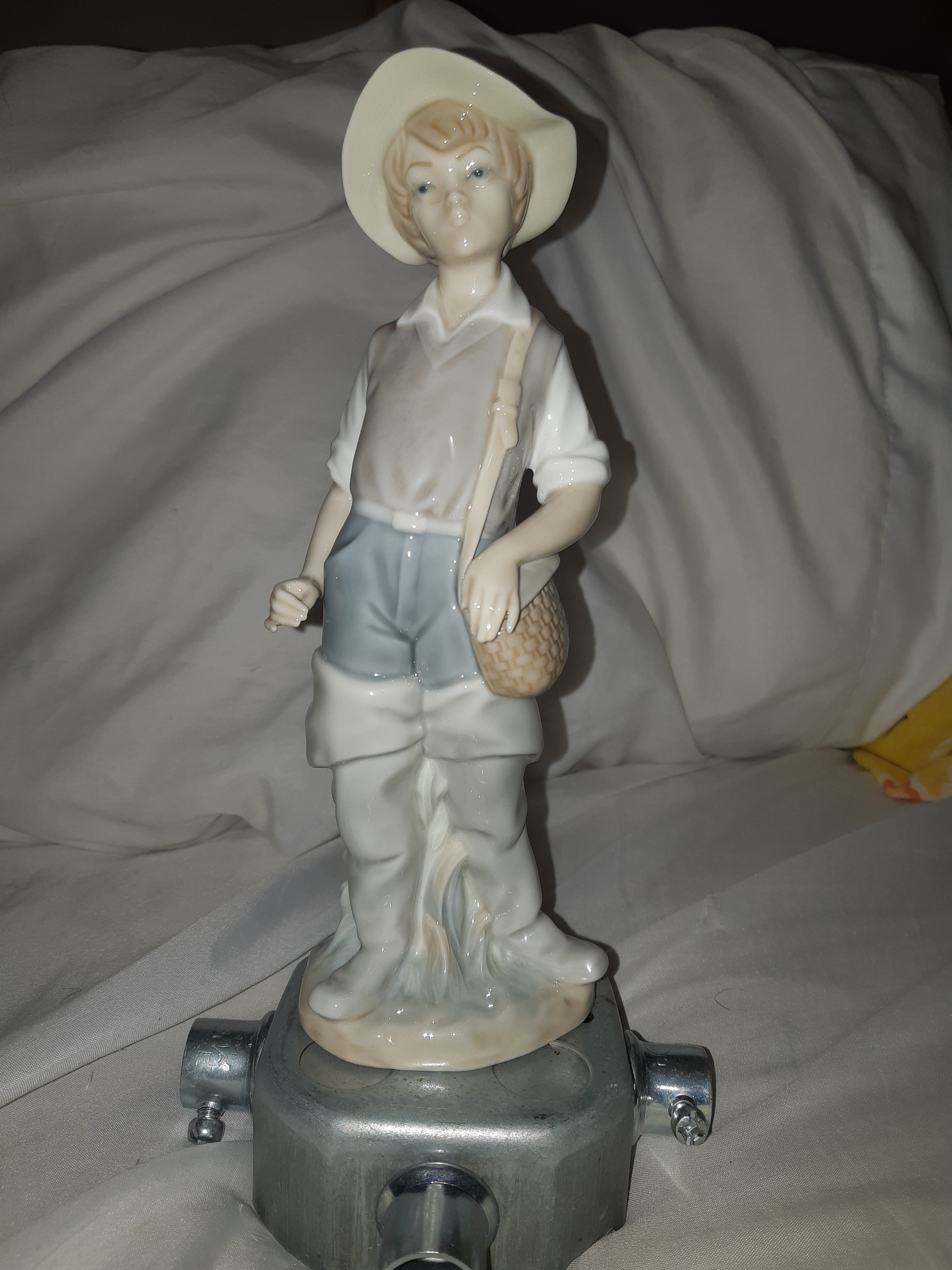
A Lladró Fisher Boy porcelain figurine

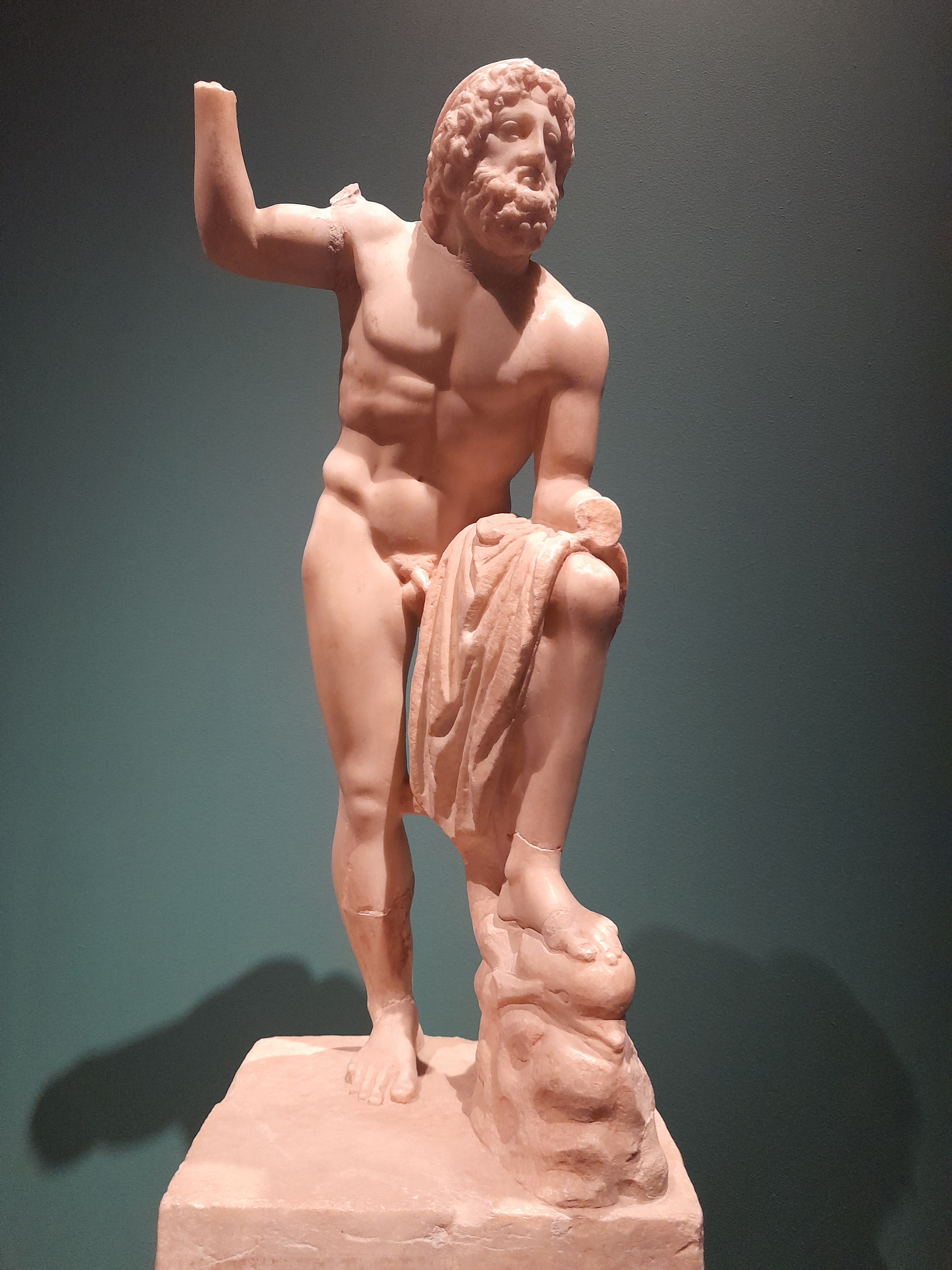
Statuette of Poseidon, marble
