= Seamen's Savings Bank =

American bank (1829–1990)

The Seamen's Bank for Savings
- Type: Public
- Industry: Banking
- Founded: May 11, 1829; 197 years ago
- Defunct: April 18, 1990; 36 years ago
- Fate: Seized by the U.S. government
- Successor: Chase Bank
- Headquarters: New York City, U.S.
- Products: Savings accounts, checking accounts, certificates of deposit, IRA accounts
- Total assets: $2.1 billion (1990)

Seamen's Savings Bank was a bank in the United States that served people in the maritime industry, especially seamen. It was founded in 1829 and operated until 1990, when it was seized by the U.S. Government for being insolvent and its assets were sold to Chase Bank.

== History ==
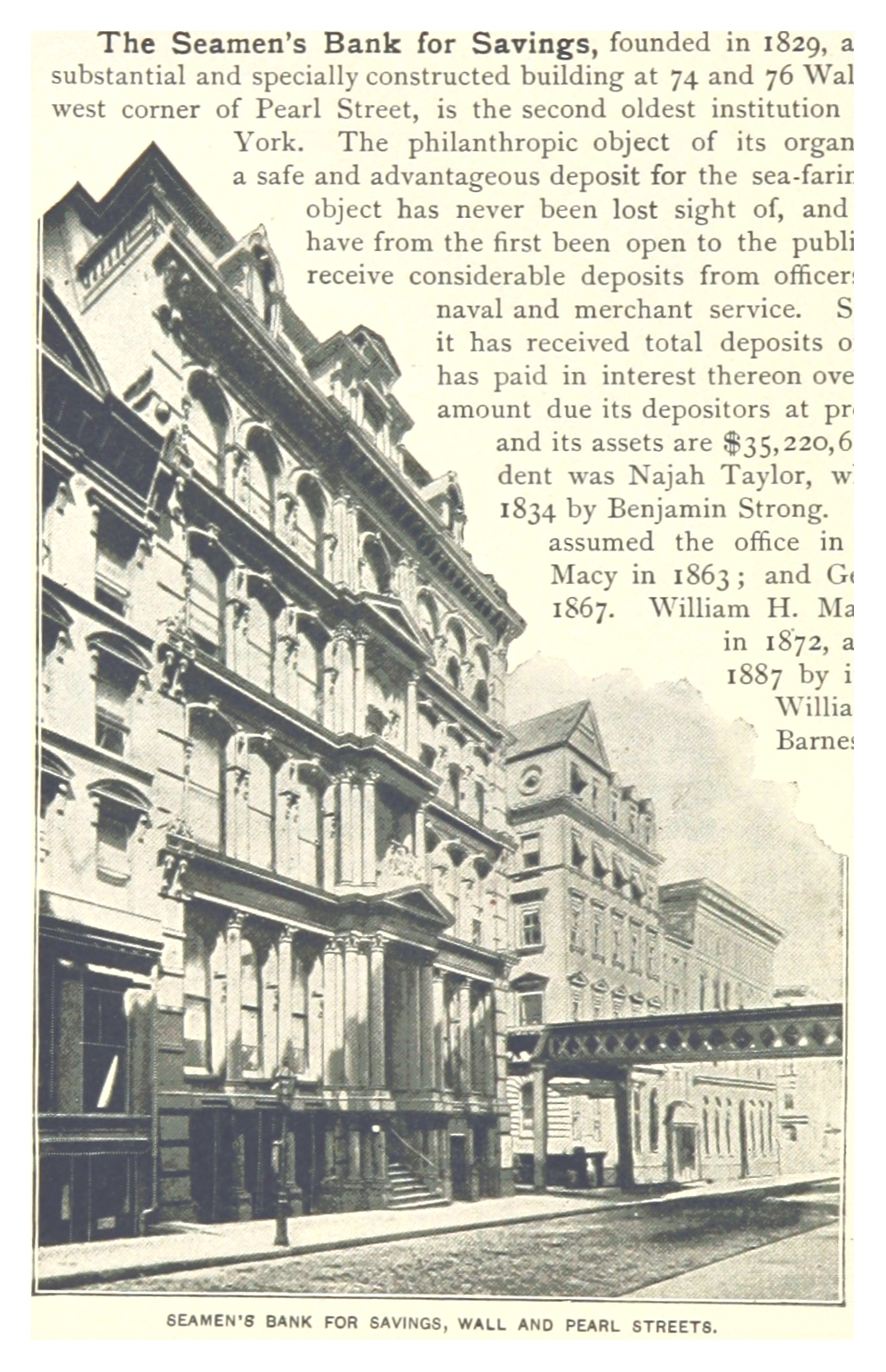
Bank building at 74 Wall and Pearl streets in Lower Manhattan

The bank was chartered on May 11, 1829, in New York City, as a mutual savings bank for the benefit of seamen and their families. It was one of the oldest savings banks in the country and the first to be established in New York City. The bank's first president was Pelatiah Perit, a prominent merchant and philanthropist.

The bank survived several financial crises, including the Panic of 1857, when there was a run on the bank by depositors. The bank was able to pay all its obligations and maintain its reputation. The bank also supported various charitable causes related to seamen, such as the Sailors' Snug Harbor and the Seamen's Church Institute of New York and New Jersey.

The bank moved its headquarters several times, but always remained in the financial district of New York City. In 1926, the bank built a new building at 74 Wall Street, designed by architect Marc Eidlitz. The site is believed to have been the location of New York City's slave market in the 18th century. The bank building features an archway adorned with maritime-themed ornamentation, including ships and mermaids. The building is now a National Register-listed landmark.

The bank converted to a federal charter in 1983 and went public in December 1985. It expanded its services and customer base beyond the maritime sector, offering various deposit and loan products. It also opened 13 branches in Manhattan, Westchester, Nassau and Suffolk counties.

However, the bank suffered losses from bad loans and investments, and failed to meet the capital requirements set by the Federal Deposit Insurance Corporation (FDIC). On April 18, 1990, the bank was seized by the U.S. Government for being insolvent. The FDIC sold the bank's assets and liabilities to Chase Bank, which assumed the bank's deposits and branches. The bank had $2.1 billion in assets and 170,000 depositors at the time of its closure.

== Publications ==
The bank published several books and pamphlets related to its history and services, such as:

- Seaman's Bank, 125 Years in Step with New York! by Michael G. Michalis (1954)
- 30 Wall; From 17th Century Stockade to the New Main Office of the Seamen's Bank for Savings in the City of New York (1955)
- The Maritime Collection of the Seamen's Bank for Savings (1960)
- The Mural Paintings in the Seamen's Bank for Savings in the City of New York (1961)
- Wall Street, 1880 (1965)
- Maritime America; A Salute to Our Country's 200th Anniversary (1976)

== Collectibles ==
The bank offered various collectibles and memorabilia to its customers and the public, such as:

- A "Jolly Sailor" ceramic coin bank for new accounts
- A "Sebastian Miniature" barometer designed by Prescott W. Baston with Native American, ship captain, and eagle figures
- A subway line and road map of New York City (1957)
- An engraved Zippo lighter
- A dollar coin in resin for its 125th anniversary
- Placemats with reproductions of Gordon Grant's tallship images from its collection
- An LP record of nautical songs performed by Bill Schustik (1976)

== Gallery ==
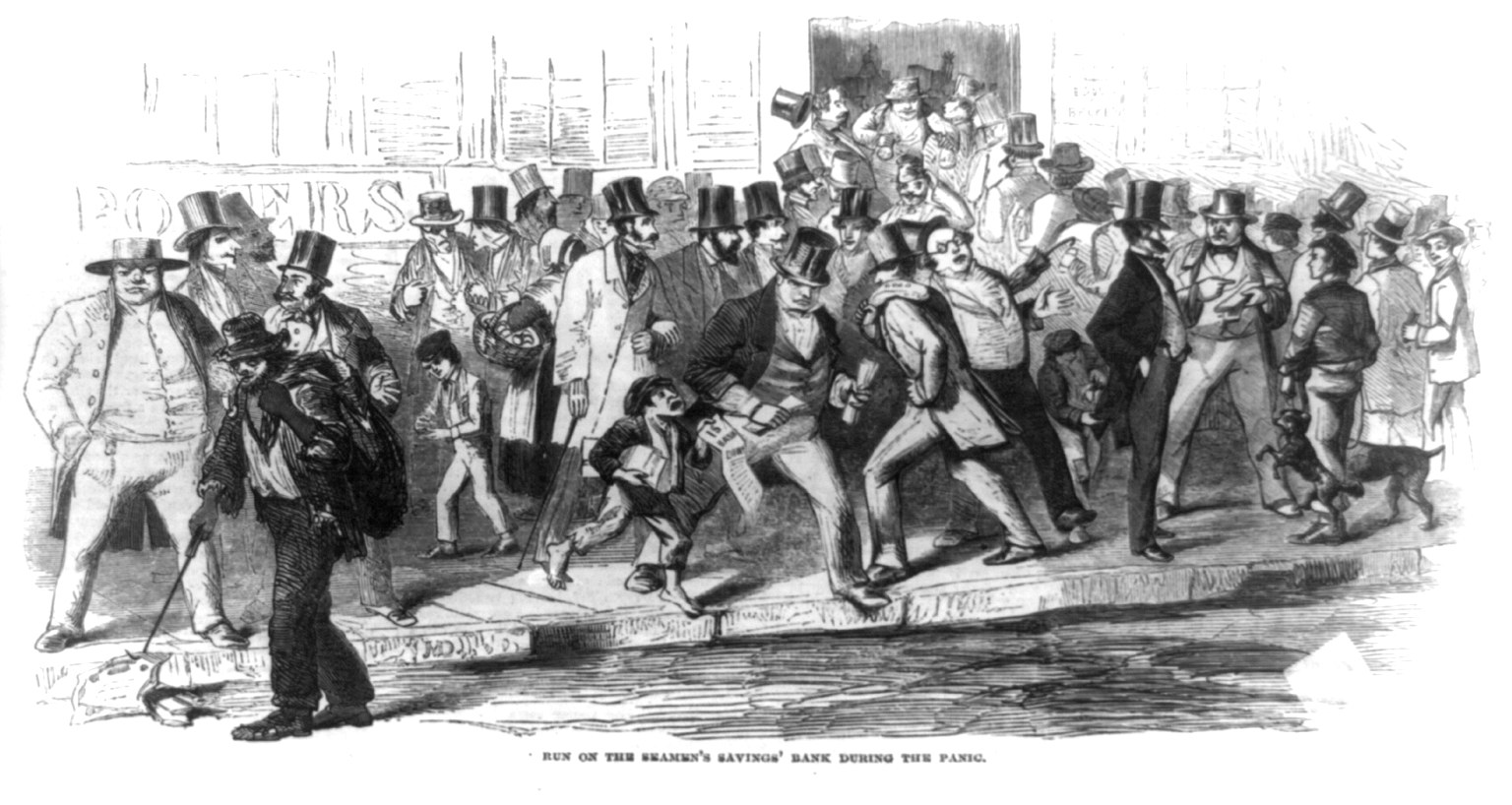
Wood engraving of bank run in 1857

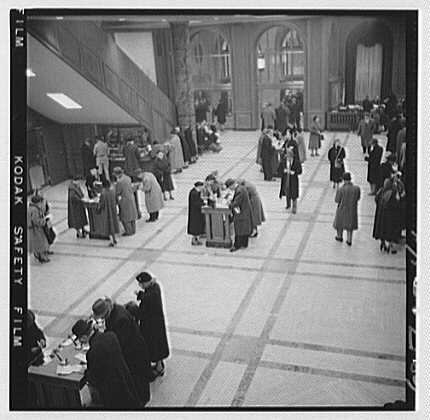

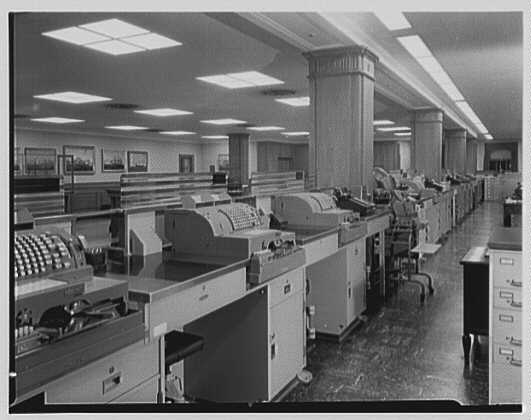

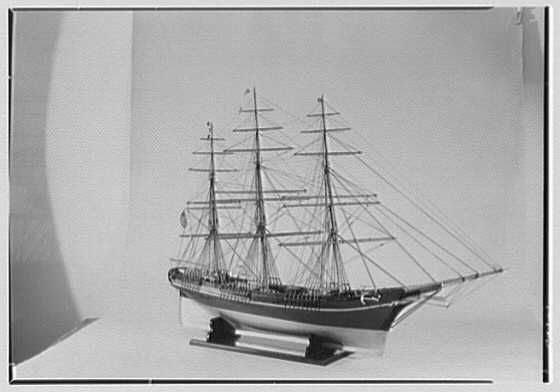

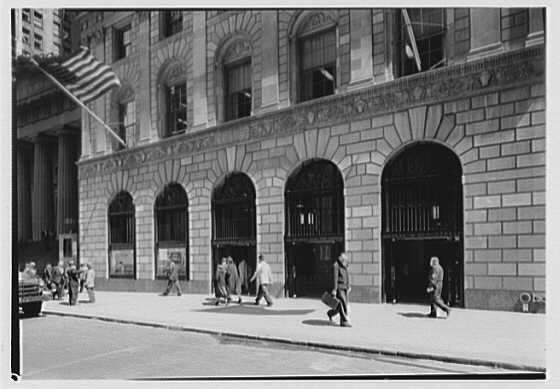
30 Wall Street

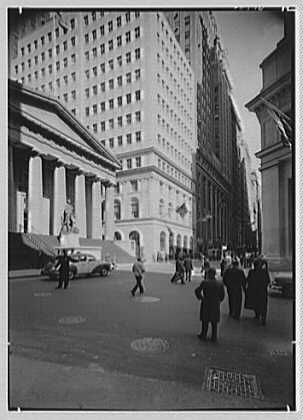

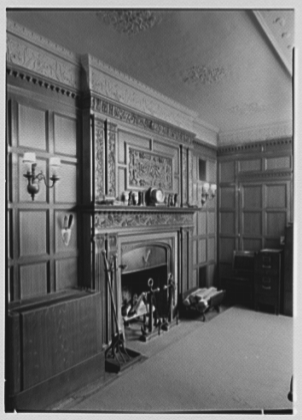

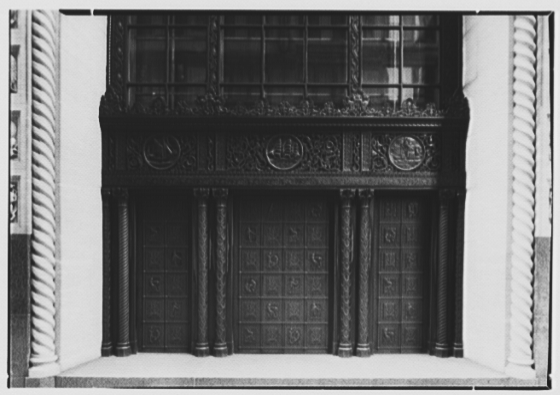

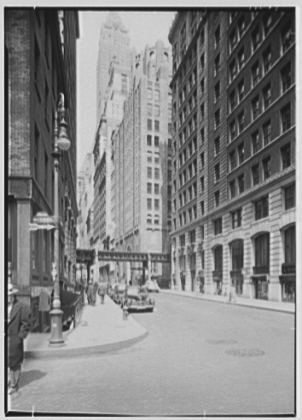

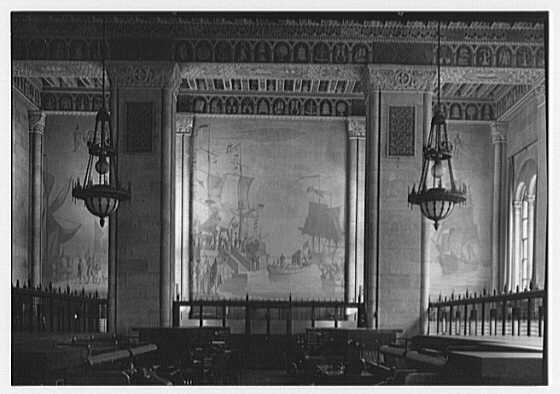

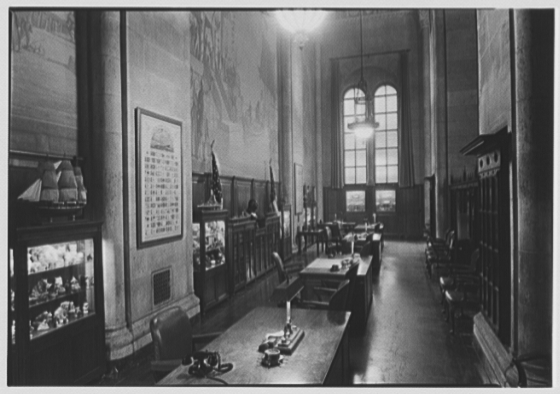

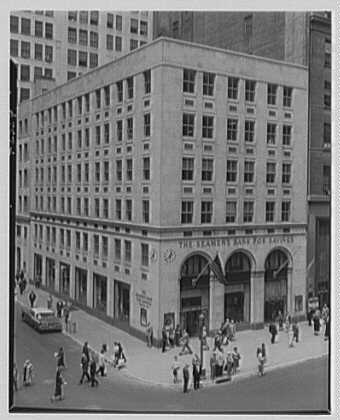
546 5th Avenue (appears to have been replaced in 1990 with a skyscraper)
