= Samuel Dwight =

English physician

- Born: 1669?
- Died: 10 November 1737
- Occupation: Physician

Samuel Dwight (1669? – 10 November 1737) was an English physician.

== Biography ==
Dwight was born about 1669. He was possibly the son of the potter John Dwight. A brother Philip was vicar of Fulham from 1708 till his death in 1729. Another brother, Edmund, was born in 1676. In July 1687 the father is described as being then of Wigan, Lancashire (Oxford Matriculation Register, cited in Welch, Alumni Westmon. 1852, p. 207). Samuel entered Westminster School in 1686, matriculated a commoner of Christ Church, Oxford, 12 July 1687, when eighteen years of age, and as a member of that house proceeded B.A. 23 May 1691, M.A. 14 Feb. 1693 (Oxford Graduates, 1851, p. 201). Some verses of his occur among the academical rejoicings on the birth of James II's son in 1688; others are in the collection celebrating the return of William III from Ireland in 1690. He was admitted a licentiate of the College of Physicians 25 June 1731. On the title-pages of two of his medical treatises, published respectively in 1725 and 1731, he is represented as a doctor of medicine; but his degree was not recognised by the college (cf. Lists of Coll. of Physicians in Brit. Mus.) He practised at Fulham, and dying there 10 November 1737, was buried in the church on the 17th (Lysons, Environs, Supplement, p. 150). Dwight was the author of:

- ‘De Vomitione, ejusque excessu curando; nec non de emeticis medicamentis, &c.,’ 8vo, London, 1722.
- ‘De Hydropibus: deque Medicamentis ad eos utilibus expellendos, &c.,’ 8vo, London, 1725.
- ‘De Febribus symptomaticis … deque earum curatione,’ 8vo, London, 1731. This last treatise is dedicated to Sir Hans Sloane, whom Dwight was accustomed to consult in cases of more than ordinary difficulty (cf. his letter to Sloane, 21 Nov. 1721, Addit. MS. 4043, f. 226). Dwight is sometimes wrongly credited (cf. Gent. Mag. vii. 702) with the inventions in pottery made by John Dwight
