= Panic of 1857 =

American economic crisis

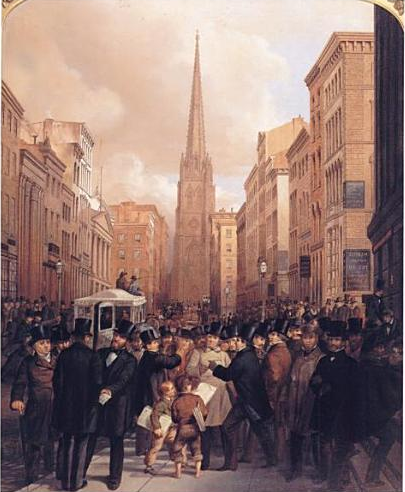
- A painting depicting the Panic of 1857
- Date: August 24, 1857 – 1859
- Location: International (originated in the United States)
- Type: Financial crisis, economic depression
- Outcome: Failure of the Ohio Life Insurance and Trust Company; Nationwide suspension of specie payments by banks; Severe drop in grain prices and railroad stock values; Widespread business bankruptcies and urban unemployment; Deepening of regional tensions prior to the American Civil War

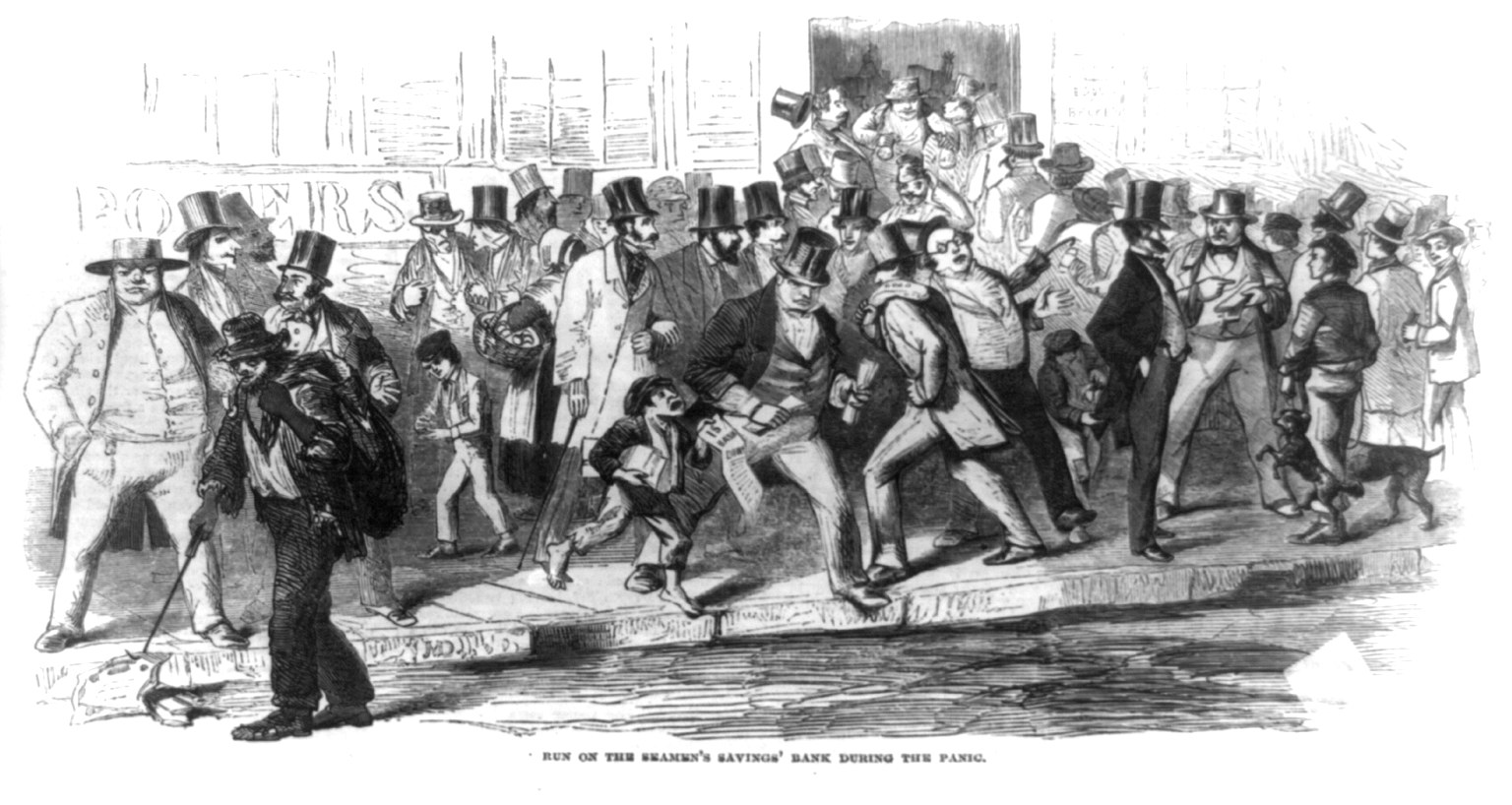
An illustration of a bank run on Seamen's Savings Bank during the Panic of 1857

The Panic of 1857 was a financial crisis in the United States caused by the declining international economy and over-expansion of the domestic economy. Because of the invention of the telegraph by Samuel F. Morse in 1844, the Panic of 1857 was the first financial crisis to spread rapidly throughout the United States. The world economy was more interconnected by the 1850s, which made the Panic of 1857 the first worldwide economic crisis. In the United Kingdom of Great Britain and Ireland, the First Palmerston ministry circumvented the requirements of the Bank Charter Act 1844, which required gold and silver reserves to back up the amount of money in circulation. Surfacing news of this circumvention set off the Panic in Britain.

Beginning in September 1857, the financial downturn did not last long, but a proper recovery was delayed until the onset of the American Civil War in 1861. The sinking of SS Central America in September 1857 contributed to the panic, because New York City banks were waiting on its much-needed shipment of gold. After the failure of Ohio Life Insurance and Trust Company, the financial panic quickly spread with businesses beginning to fail, the railroad industry experiencing financial declines, and hundreds of thousands of workers being laid off.

Because the years immediately preceding the Panic of 1857 were prosperous, many banks, merchants, and farmers had seized the opportunity to take risks with their investments, and, as soon as market prices began to fall, they quickly began to experience the effects of financial panic. American banks did not recover until after the Civil War.

== Background ==
The early 1850s had great economic prosperity in the United States, stimulated by the large amount of gold mined in the California Gold Rush that greatly expanded the money supply. By the mid-1850s, the amount of gold mined began to decline, causing western bankers and investors to become wary. Eastern banks became cautious with their loans in the eastern US, and some even refused to accept paper currencies issued by western banks.

The US Supreme Court decided Dred Scott v. Sandford in March 1857. After the enslaved man Dred Scott sued for his freedom, Chief Justice Roger Taney ruled that Scott was not a citizen because he was black, and so did not have the right to sue in court. Taney also called the Missouri Compromise unconstitutional and said that the federal government could not prohibit slavery in US territories. The decision had a significant impact on the development of the western territories. Soon after the decision, "the political struggle between 'free soil' and slavery in the territories" began.

The western territories north of the Missouri Compromise line were now opened to the expansion of slavery, which would obviously have drastic financial and political effects: "Kansas land warrants and western railroad securities' prices declined slightly just after the Dred Scott decision in early March." This fluctuation in railroad securities proved "that political news about future territories called the tune in the land and railroad securities markets".

Before 1857, the railroad industry had been booming due to large migrations of people to the west, especially to Kansas. The large influx of people made the railroad industry profitable, and the banks began to provide railroad companies with large loans. Many of the companies never made it past the stage of a paper railroad and never owned the physical assets necessary to run a real one. A railroad industry stock market bubble began, and railroad stocks had increasingly speculative entries into the fray, worsening the bubble. In the meantime, the Dred Scott decision lent uncertainty to railroads in general.

== Stock market decline ==
In July 1857, railroad stock values peaked. On August 11, 1857, N. H. Wolfe and Company, the oldest flour and grain company in New York City, failed, shaking investor confidence and beginning a slow selling-off in the market that continued into late August.

== Failure of Ohio Life Insurance and Trust Company ==
On the morning of August 24, 1857, the president of Ohio Life Insurance and Trust Company announced that its New York branch had suspended payments. The company, an Ohio-based bank with a second main office in New York City, had large mortgage holdings and was the liaison to other Ohio investment banks. Ohio Life went bankrupt because of fraudulent activities by the company's management, which threatened to precipitate the failure of other Ohio banks or, even worse, to create a run on the banks.

In an article printed in the New York Daily Times, Ohio Life's "New York City and Cincinnati [branches were] suspended; with liabilities, it is said, of $7,000,000". The banks connected to Ohio Life were reimbursed and "avoided suspending convertibility by credibly coinsuring one another against runs". The failure of Ohio Life brought attention to the financial state of the railroad industry and land markets and caused the financial panic to become more public.

== Lasting effects ==
By early 1858, "commercial credit had dried up, forcing already debt-ridden merchants of the West to curtail new purchases of inventory". The limited purchasing in the West led to merchants around the country seeing decreases in sales and profits. The railroads "had created an interdependent national economy, and now an economic downturn in the West threatened.... [an] economic crisis". Because many banks had financed railroads and land purchases, they began to feel the pressures of the falling value of railroad securities. The Illinois Central; Erie; Pittsburgh, Fort Wayne and Chicago; and Reading Railroad lines were all forced to shut down by the financial downturn. The Delaware, Lackawanna and Western Railroad and the Fond du Lac Railroad were forced to declare bankruptcy.

The Boston and Worcester Railroad Company experienced heavy financial difficulties. The employees were informed in a memo written in late October 1857 that "the receipts from Passengers and Freight have fallen off during [the] last month, as compared with the corresponding month of last year, over twenty thousand dollars, with very little prospect of any improvement during the coming winter". The company announced that its workers would receive a "reduction in pay of ten percent". In addition to the decreasing value of railroad securities, farmers began to default on payments on their mortgaged lands in the West, which put even more financial pressure on banks.

The prices of grain decreased significantly. Farmers experienced a loss in revenue, causing banks to foreclose on recently purchased lands. In 1855, grain prices had skyrocketed to $2.19 a bushel, and farmers began to purchase land to increase their crop supply, which increased their profits. By 1858, grain prices dropped severely to $0.80 a bushel. Many Midwestern towns felt the pressures of the Panic. For example, the town of Keokuk, Iowa, experienced financial strife from the economic downturns of the Panic:

A huge municipal debt magnified Keokuk's problems. By 1858, the town owed $900,000, mostly on railroad bonds, while the value of its taxable property dropped by $5.5 million. Lots that brought $1,000 before the crash now could not be sold for $10. Hard-hit property owners were unable to pay their taxes, and thousands of properties slipped into tax delinquency.

As a result of such a decrease of prices, land sales declined dramatically and westward expansion essentially halted until the Panic ended. Both merchants and farmers began to suffer for the investment risks taken when prices had been high.

== Remedies ==
By 1859, the Panic began to level off, and the economy had begun to stabilize. President James Buchanan announced that the paper-money system seemed to be the root cause of the Panic and then decided to withdraw the usage of all bank notes under twenty dollars. He "advised the State banks to break away from the banks [and urged] them to follow the example of the Federal Government".

He said that would decrease the paper money supply to allow the specie supply time to increase and to reduce inflation rates. Buchanan wanted the state banks to follow the federal government, specifically the Independent Treasury system, which allowed the federal government to keep up with specie payments. That helped to alleviate some of the financial stress that had been brought on by the bank suspensions.

In his State of the Union message December 7, 1857, Buchanan said:

Thanks to the independent treasury, the government has not suspended [specie] payments, as it was compelled to do by the failure of the banks in 1837. It will continue to discharge its liabilities to the people in gold and silver. Its disbursements in coin pass into circulation and materially assist in restoring a sound currency.

He revealed the new strategy of "reform not relief" and expressed his position that "the government sympathized but could do nothing to alleviate the suffering individuals." To avoid further financial panics, Buchanan encouraged the US Congress to pass a law to provide the immediate forfeiture of a bank's charter if a bank suspended specie payments. He asked state banks to keep one dollar in specie for every three issued as paper, and he discouraged the use of federal or state bonds as security on bank notes to avoid future inflation.

== Results ==
The result of the Panic of 1857 was that the largely agrarian southern economy, which had few railroads, suffered little, but the northern economy took a significant hit and made a slow recovery. The area affected the most by the Panic was the Great Lakes region, and the troubles of that region were "quickly passed to those enterprises in the East that depended upon western sales". After approximately a year, much of the economy in the North and the entire South had recovered from the Panic.

By the end of the Panic, in 1859, tensions between the North and South regarding the issue of slavery in the United States were increasing. The Panic of 1857 encouraged those in the South who believed the North needed the South to keep a stabilized economy, and southern threats of secession were temporarily quelled. Southerners believed that the Panic of 1857 made the North "more amenable to southern demands" and would help to keep slavery alive in the United States.

According to Kathryn Teresa Long, the religious revival of 1857–1858 led by Jeremiah Lanphier began among New York City businessmen in the early months of the Panic.

== Crisis in the United Kingdom ==
News of the crisis in America caused runs on the banks in Glasgow, Liverpool, and London. The Borough Bank of Liverpool closed its doors on October 27, 1857, and the Western Bank of Scotland failed on November 9 as did the City of Glasgow Bank two days later. The government was forced to suspend the Bank Charter Act 1844 again on November 12.

The bullion in the Bank of England started increasing soon after, but unlike the Panic of 1847, the suspension was required this time for the British currency to remain legal and convertible under the Bank Charter Act 1844. The fiduciary issue was temporarily increased to the extent of £2 million and was used between November 18 and December 23, 1857.

== See also ==
- Black Friday (1869)—Also referred to as the Gold Panic of 1869
- Financial crisis
- Panic of 1873
- Panic of 1893
- New England Shoemakers Strike of 1860

== Bibliography ==
- Calomiris, Charles W.; Schweikart, Larry (1991). "The Panic of 1857: Origins, Transmission, and Containment". Journal of Economic History. 51 (4): 807–834. doi:10.1017/S0022050700040122. S2CID 154508073.
- Glasner, David, ed. Business Cycles and Depressions: An Encyclopedia 1997.
- Huston, James L. (1987). The Panic of 1857 and The Coming of the Civil War. Baton Rouge: Louisiana State University Press. ISBN 978-0-8071-1368-4.
- Huston, James L (1983). "Western Grains and the Panic of 1857". Agricultural History. 57 (1): 14–32. JSTOR 3742656.
- Kelly, Morgan; Gráda, Cormac Ó (2000). "Market Contagion: Evidence from the Panics of 1854 and 1857" (PDF). American Economic Review. 90 (5): 1110–1124. doi:10.1257/aer.90.5.1110. hdl:10197/459. JSTOR 2677843. S2CID 17705462.
- Klein, Philip Shriver. President James Buchanan (Pennsylvania State University Press, 1962).
- Kynaston, David (2017). Till Time's Last Sand: A History of the Bank of England, 1694–2013. New York: Bloomsbury. pp. 161–164. ISBN 978-1-4088-6856-0.
- McPherson, James M. (2003). Battle Cry of Freedom: The Civil War Era. New York: Oxford University Press. ISBN 978-0-19-503863-7.
- Long, Kathryn Teresa (1998). The Revival of 1857–58: Interpreting an American Religious Awakening. Oxford University Press. Archived from the original on June 5, 2011 – via Questia.
- Rezneck, Samuel. Business Depressions and Financial Panics (Greenwood 1968).
- Ross, Michael A. Justice of Shattered Dreams: Samuel Freeman Miller and the Supreme Court During the Civil War Era . Baton Rouge: Louisiana State University Press, 2003.
- Sobel, Robert (1973). "The Panic of 57". Machines and Morality: The 1850s. New York: Crowell. ISBN 978-0-690-00266-9.
- Spiegelman, Mortimer (1948). "The Failure of Ohio Life Insurance and Trust Company, 1857". Ohio State Archaeological and Historical Quarterly. 57: 247–65.
- Stampp, Kenneth (1990). America in 1857: A Nation on the Brink. New York: Oxford University Press. ISBN 978-0-19-503902-3.
- Twichell, G (1937). "Labor Relations in 1857". Bulletin of the Business Historical Society. 11 (2): 28–29. doi:10.2307/3110999. JSTOR 3110999.
- Van Vleck, George W. The Panic of 1857, an Analytical Study (New York: Columbia University Press, 1943)

=== Contemporary newspaper ===
- "Commercial Affairs" New York Daily Times, August 28, 1857
- "A New Tariff" New York Daily Times, February 4, 1857
