= Jeremiah Lanphier =

American missionary (1809–1898)

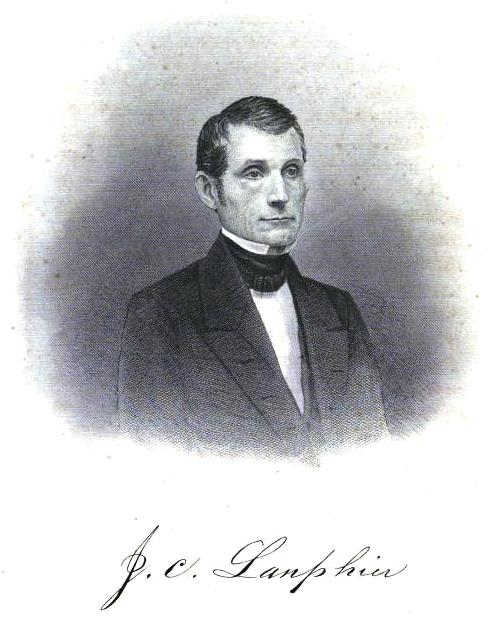
Jeremiah Lanphier c. 1860

Jeremiah Calvin Lanphier (September 3, 1809 – December 26, 1898) was an American lay missionary in New York City, popularly regarded as having been instrumental in instigating the American religious revival of 1857–58.

== Early life and conversion ==
Jeremiah Lanphier was born in Coxsackie, New York, the son of Samuel F. Lanphier, a farmer and currier, and Jane Ross Lanphier, whose parents had emigrated from Holland. At sixteen, Lanphier apprenticed as a tailor in Albany and later also studied music there under one George Andrews. In 1833, Lanphier and Andrews became partners as cloth merchants in Lower Manhattan. They entered a highly competitive market for ready-made clothing, and after extending credit in an attempt to attract customers, they went bankrupt in the spring of 1842.

While Lanphier worked as a cloth merchant, he also joined the choir at Broadway Tabernacle (a church organized by Lewis Tappan for revivalist Charles Grandison Finney), where Lanphier became an evangelical Christian. He then joined the choir at Market Street Church, pastored by noted Presbyterian clergyman Theodore L. Cuyler, and later the choir at the Pearl Street Presbyterian Church, where he made many friends and took an active interest in the work of the church.

== Entering ministry ==
During the 1850s, prosperous churches with wealthy congregants moved uptown to more fashionable neighborhoods. Pearl Street Church closed in 1853, and Lanphier joined Duane Street Presbyterian Church, pastored by theologian and advocate of religious revival James Waddel Alexander. Duane Street Church had itself moved northward twice, although Lanphier continued to live in lower Manhattan where the number of unchurched residents increased. When a member of the consistory of the nearby North Dutch Church (with an entrance on Fulton Street) offered Lanphier a position as lay missionary, Lamphier closed his business and began his work for the church on July 1, 1857.

Although Lanphier had no theological training, he was a remarkably good candidate for such a ministry. He never married, and he had no children. A contemporary described him as "tall, well made, with a remarkably pleasant, benevolent face; affectionate in his disposition and manner, possessed of indomitable energy and perseverance, having good musical attainments; gifted in prayer and exhortation to a remarkable degree; modest in his demeanor, ardent in his piety, sound in his judgment; having good common sense, a thorough knowledge of human nature, and those traits of character that make him a welcome guest in any house".

== Fulton Street Prayer Meeting ==
Although Lanphier distributed tracts, visited local businesses, invited children to Sunday school, and encouraged hotels to refer guests to the church on Sunday, he found that his time spent in prayer brought him the most peace and resolve, and he determined to start a weekly noon prayer meeting for businessmen that would take advantage of the hour when businesses were closed for lunch. The handbill he had printed read: "[Wednesday] prayer meeting from 12 to 1 o’clock. Stop 5, 10 or 20 minutes, or the whole time, as your time admits." On September 23, 1857, he set up a signboard in front of the church. No one came to the appointed room, and Lanphier prayed by himself for thirty minutes. At 12:30 another man joined him, four more by the end of the hour.

The next week there were twenty men, forty the following week. In October the prayer meetings became daily, and in January 1858, a second room had to be used simultaneously, by February, a third. By then as many as twenty noon prayer meetings were being held elsewhere in the city. In mid-March Burton's Theatre, capable of holding 3,000, was crowded for the prayer meetings. By the end of March every downtown New York church and public hall was filled to capacity, and ten thousand men were gathering daily for prayer.

== Revival of 1857–59 ==
The telegraph and newspapers spread the news of this religious excitement in New York, and the Panic of 1857 undoubtedly added a sense of uncertainty and urgency to gatherings of businessmen. Similar prayer meetings were organized across the country. J. Edwin Orr, a student of the revival, estimated that perhaps as many as a million people were converted in 1858 and 1859, more than 3% of a contemporary United States population of less than thirty million. Not long before his death, the thoughts of the late 19th-century evangelist Dwight L. Moody turned to this religious revival of his youth. "I would like before I go hence", he said, "to see the whole Church of God quickened as it was in '57."

Although it has been common in the 21st century to attribute the beginning of the revival to Lanphier's prayer meeting, his former pastor James Alexander believed that when Lanphier and "a few liked-minded servants of God" first met, "Revival was already begun. God had already poured out the Spirit of grace and of supplications. We doubt not there was a simultaneous effusion on other groups and in other places." And as Iain Murray has suggested, the extent to which the revival was a "layman's revival" has also probably been exaggerated.

== Later career and death ==
Meanwhile, throughout the revival and for years afterward, Lanphier continued to hold his daily prayer meeting in lower Manhattan. As The New York Times wrote after his retirement in 1893, "success did not elate him, nor was he discouraged by indifference". There were few simple rules for the prayer meeting that Lanphier politely but firmly enforced: that those praying out loud were to be limited to five minutes and that no controversial topics were to be discussed. Women did attend the meetings and could make requests but were not permitted to pray out loud. In the early days, hundreds of prayer requests came in to the Fulton Street meeting from all parts of the country sparking a fear that "a kind of superstitious feeling might be encouraged in those who send these communications". But it was decided not to refuse any request and to pray for them all in humility.

When Lanphier finally retired because of age and his declining vision, it was estimated that he had presided at more than 11,000 prayer meetings, at which more than a half million people had attended over 36 years, and that 56,000 prayers had been offered and 225,000 written requests for prayer had been submitted, besides those made verbally. Lanphier died on December 26, 1898, and is buried in Green-Wood Cemetery, Brooklyn.

To honor the 150th anniversary of the Prayer Meeting Revival, sculptor Lincoln Fox was commissioned to create a statue of Lanphier. The sculpture, first placed outside the headquarters of the American Bible Society and near the location where the prayer meetings had been held, depicts Lanphier seated on an (anachronistic) park bench, Bible in hand, inviting passersby to pray with him. After the ABS left New York City, the statue was moved to the lobby of The King's College.
