= Fulham Pottery =

Stoneware maker in London, 1672-1956

Coordinates: 51°28′11.35″N 0°12′31.81″W

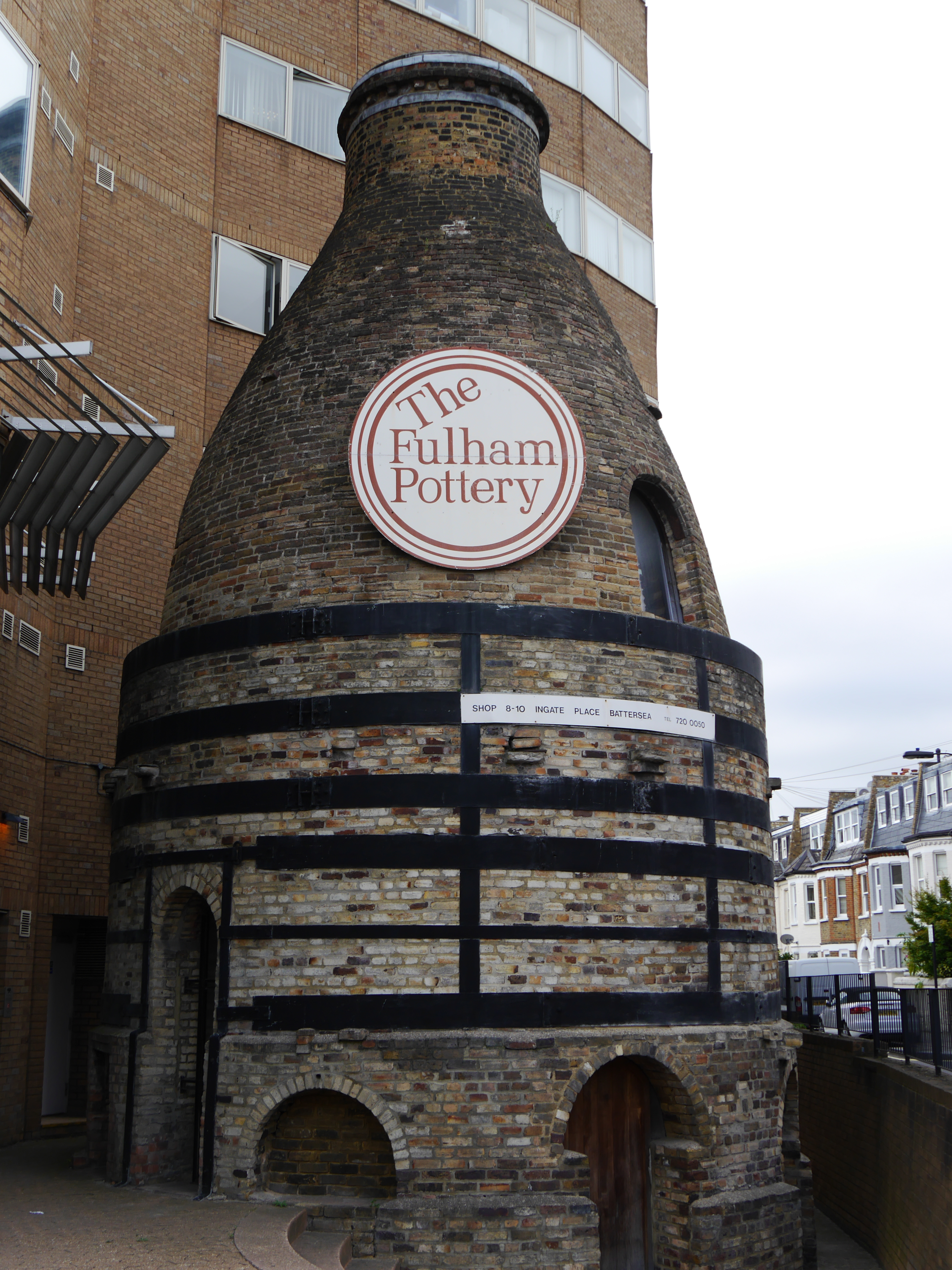
Fulham Pottery, 2016

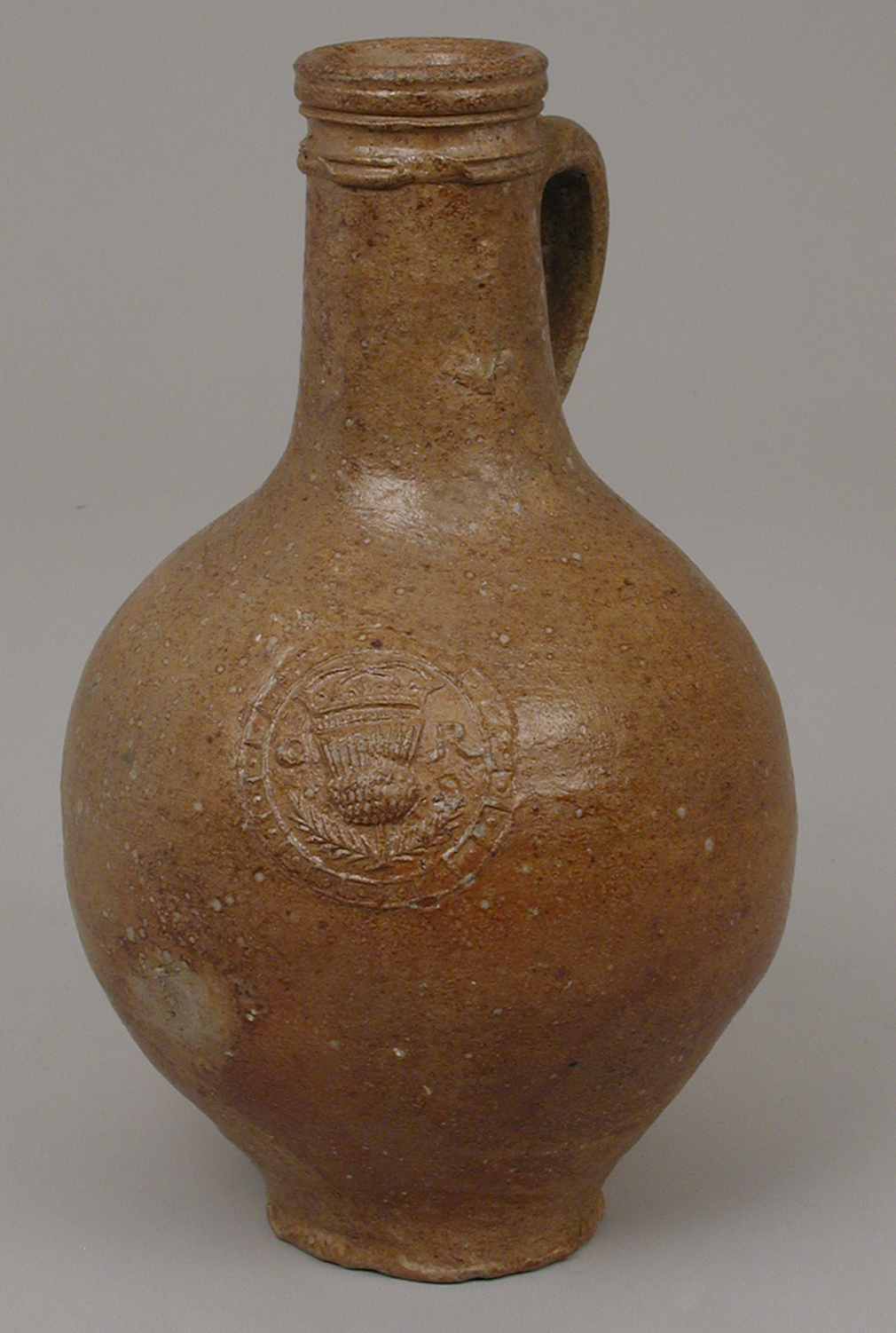
Bottle with the Arms of Scotland in stamped medallion, initials "C.R.", for Charles II of England, c. 1675–76

The Fulham Pottery was founded in Fulham, London, by John Dwight in 1672, at the junction of New King's Road and Burlington Road, Fulham, not far from Putney Bridge. Dwight is the earliest clearly documented maker of stoneware in England, although immigrant Dutch or German potters were probably active several decades before. By 1690 there was a rival stoneware operation in Fulham, run by the Dutch Elers brothers, who after a few years went off to become important early figures in transforming the Staffordshire pottery industry.

In its first years it was a pioneering force in English pottery in several respects, in particular salt-glazed wares and figures. After Dwight's death in 1703 the pottery made less ambitious stonewares until a revival in the later 19th century. It operated on the same site until 1956, and then until at least the 1980s as a base for studio pottery to be fired. Today, all that remains of the original pottery is one large bottle kiln, "probably 19th-century", which is now a Grade II listed building.

== Wares and history ==
=== John Dwight ===
From the earliest days, the pottery was a significant manufacturer of salt-glazed stoneware, initially brown, and later white; often the two glaze colours were combined in different zones. Dwight was a very early experimenter with porcelain, approaching the matter scientifically, keeping records of his trials. Dwight's background was not in pottery; he had a Master of Arts degree from Oxford University, and worked as an assistant to Robert Boyle in the later 1650s. Excavations in the 1970s uncovered many of his coded test pieces, dated to 1673–74, which the Museum of London describes as "porcelain", although such wares never seem to have been produced for sale. The Museum of London, which has the excavated pieces, has a small porcelain vase, deliberately broken, with painted floral decoration, and a similar unpainted one. The stoneware vessels often copied German shapes and decoration, while the porcelain shapes imitate Chinese porcelain.

In its first years the pottery produced some small sculptural pieces of good quality, which were unprecedented in English pottery. These were figures of classical gods and busts of Dwight's family and English royalty, which were evidently modelled by sculptors brought in, though scholars cannot agree which. Most of the small number of examples in the London museums were made as one-off hand-modelled pieces, rather than using moulds to allow repetition, and seem to have come from a sale after Dwight's last descendant died in 1859. The Victoria and Albert Museum has a memorial statuette of his daughter Lydia Dwight, who died aged 6 in 1674, standing in her burial clothes with a skull at her foot. This was a private image for the family of the dead girl. Another half-length figure shows the girl dead in her bed, holding a posy of flowers.

=== After 1703 ===
After Dwight died in 1703, the business continued under his daughter and later other members of the family, but the range and quality of wares declined, and (at least the survivals) are mostly "tavernware": bottles, jugs, mugs and the like, many with relief decoration (hunting scenes appealed to the tavern market) and inscribed or impressed inscriptions, the latter using printer's type. A relief moulded mug shown below has a version of William Hogarth's print Midnight Modern Conversation, a satirical drinking scene, and "a very popular subject found on mugs and jugs of this type", above the inevitable hunting scene. The stamped inscription "Richd – Turner; Three Sugar – Loaves (across the medallion); Rickmansworth Herts (below)" shows it was made for Richard Turner, landlord of the "Three Sugar Loaves" inn in Rickmansworth, Herts.

John Doulton, founder of the later Doulton & Co. (now Royal Doulton) finished an apprenticeship there in 1815, as "a noted big ware thrower"; he went on to found his own firm in Lambeth and make a fortune supplying Victorian England with drain and sewage pipes. Fulham continued to produce wares, but had "nearly fallen into ruin" by 1864, when it was bought by C.J.C. Bailey, who revived it, making architectural ceramics in stoneware, and also following Doulton's in making some art pottery from the late 1860s. The pottery changed hands again in 1888, and was soon mainly making salt-glazed stoneware again, which continued until 1956. The pottery continued to fire pieces of studio pottery, and in the 1980s produced a number of pieces with Quentin Bell, Philip Sutton and others.

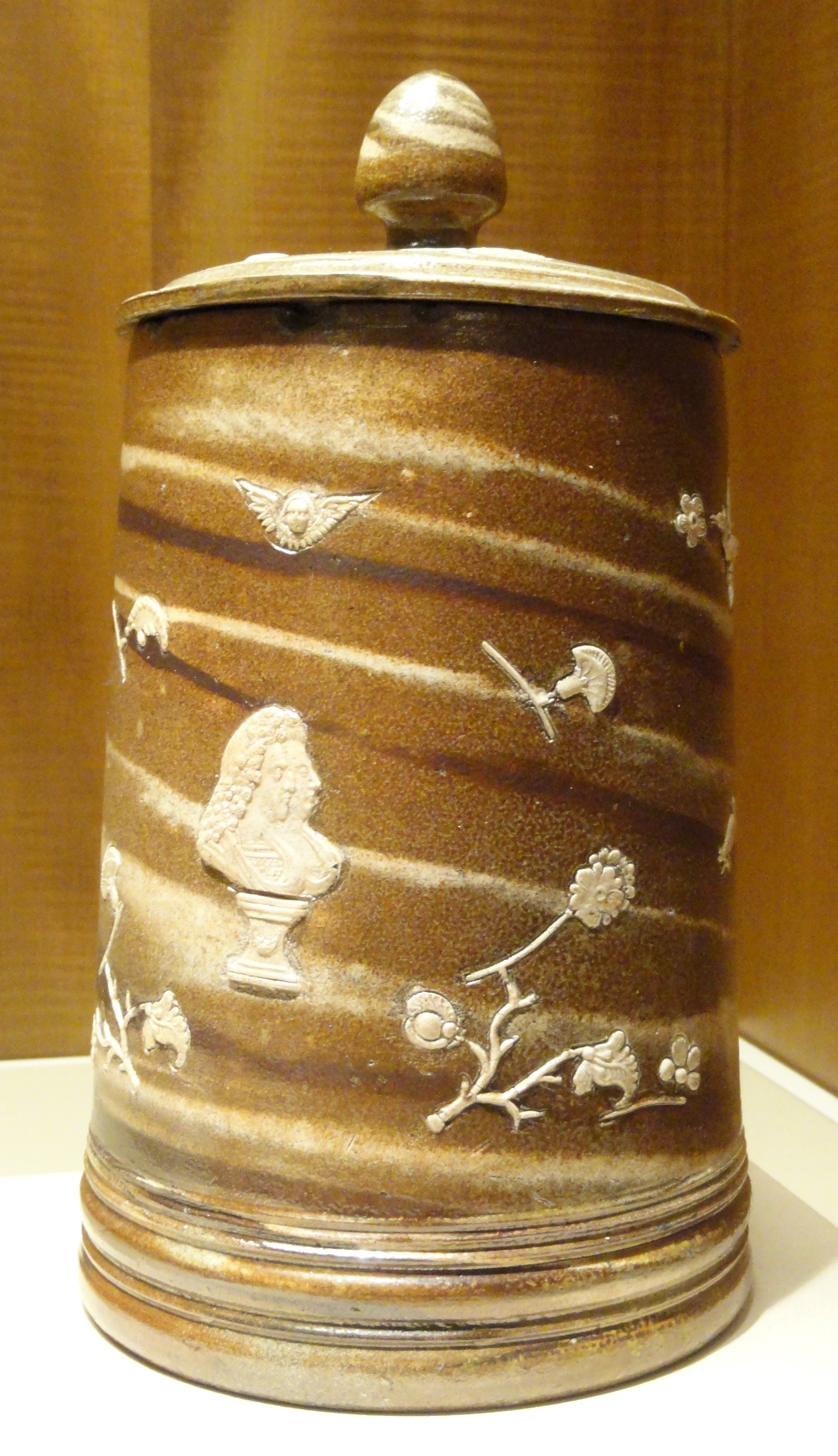
Covered tankard, c. 1685–1690, with sprigged decoration including a double bust of William and Mary

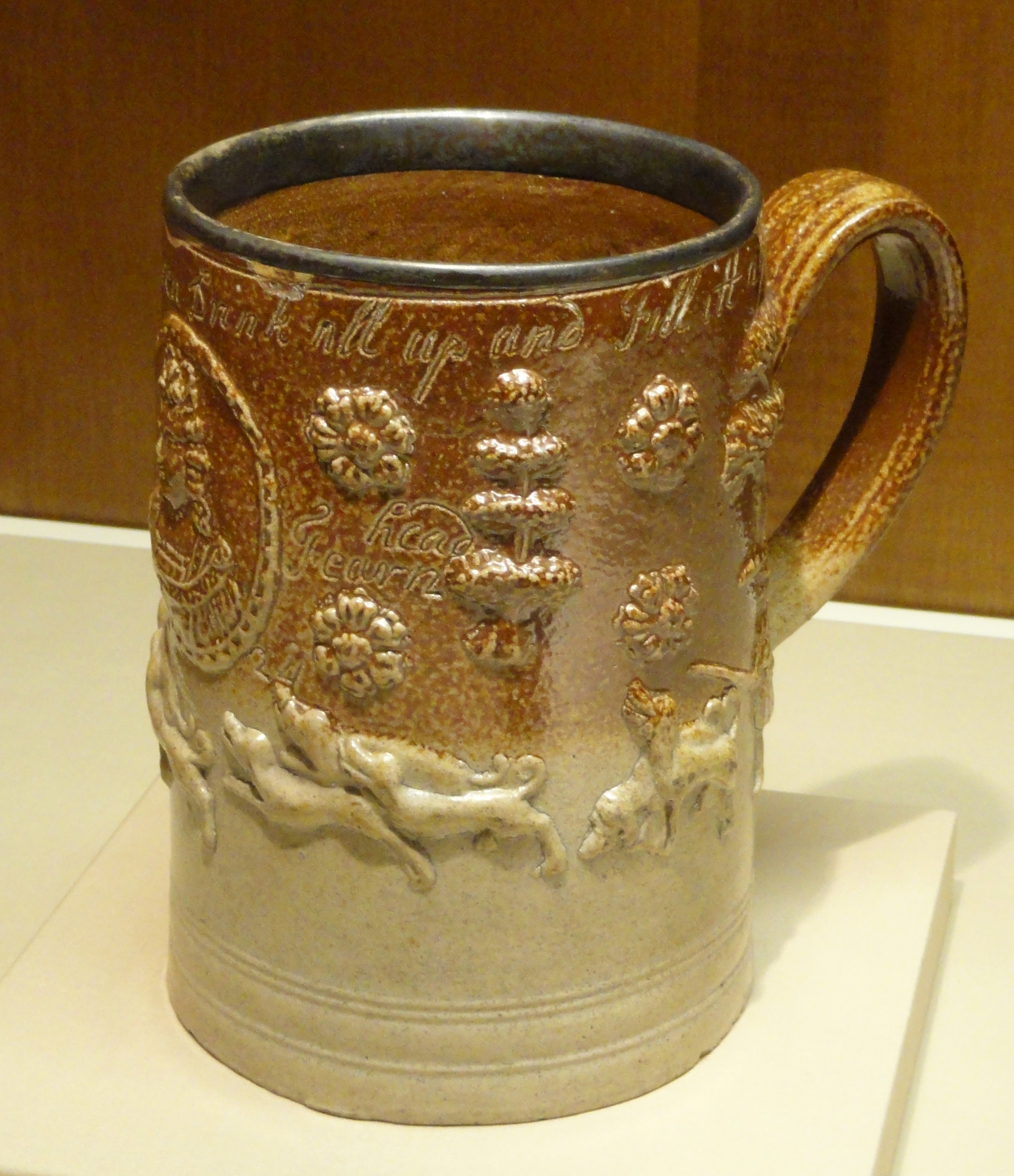
Mug with hunting scene and metal rim, dated 1724, inscription includes "Drink all up and Fill itt"

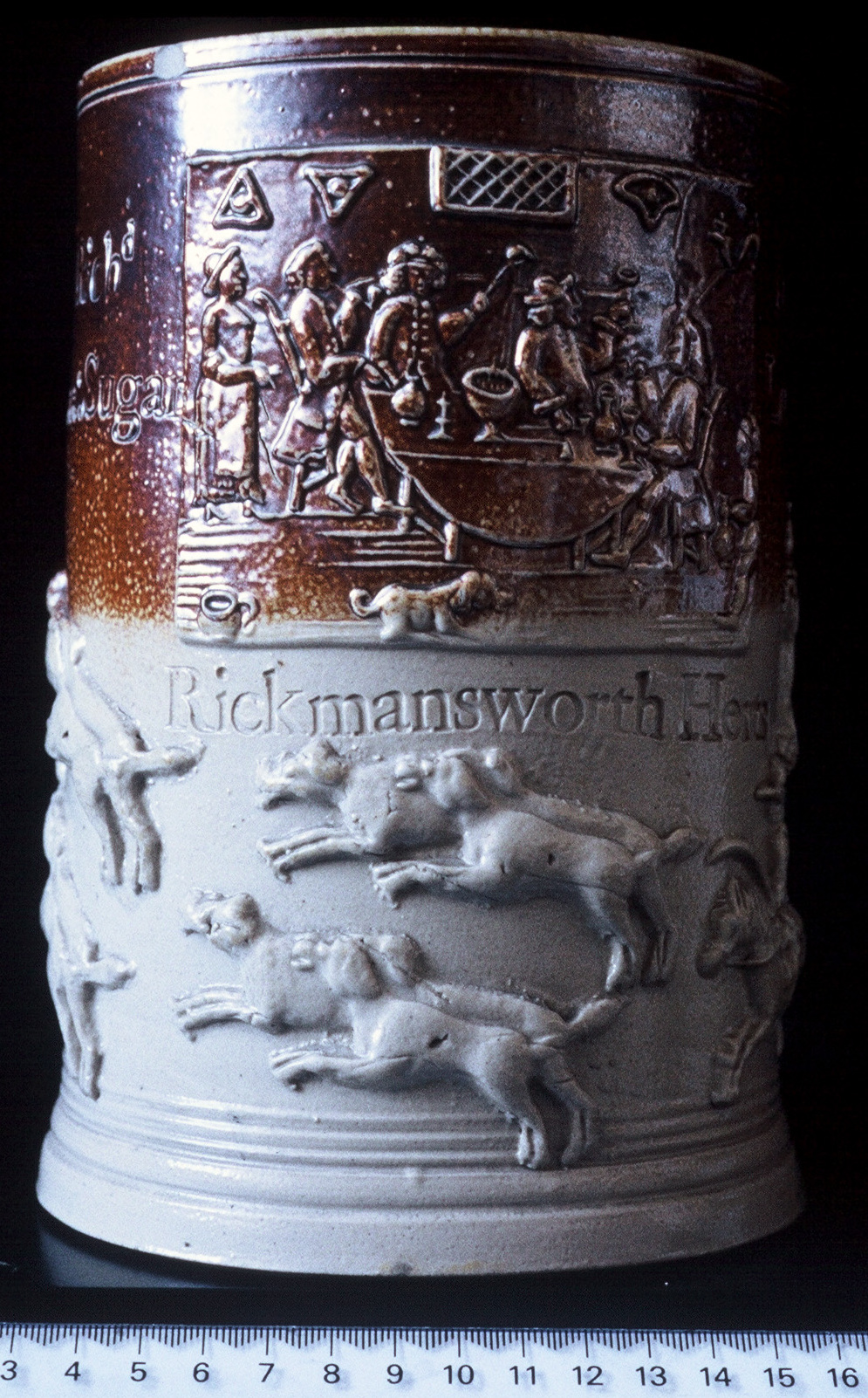
Mug, c. 1730, inscribed "Richd – Turner; Three Sugar - Loaves (across the medallion); Rickmansworth Herts (below)" – see text

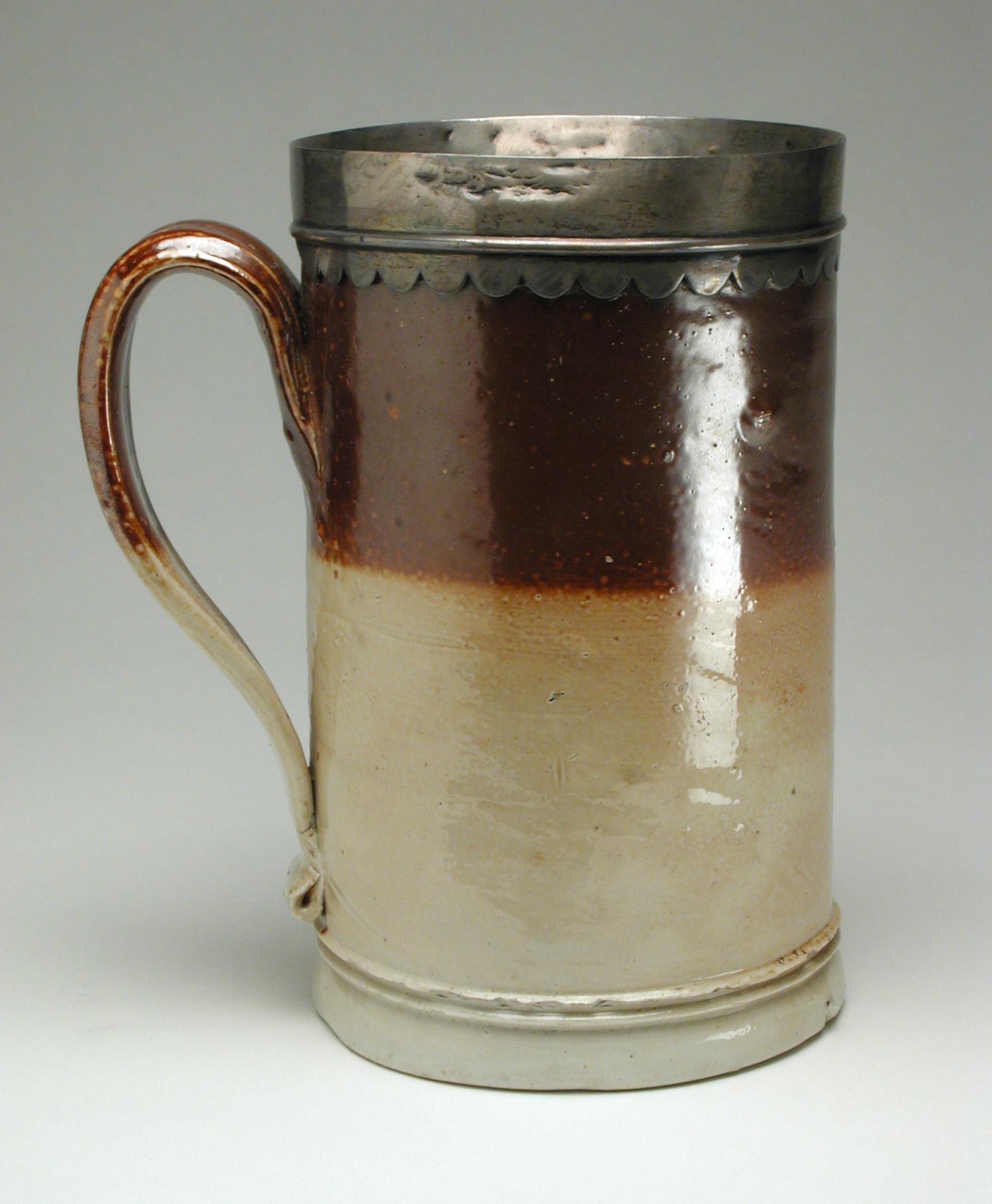
Mug with metal rim, 1700±25
