= Sebastian Miniatures =

Ceramic figurine series

- Product type: Figurines of historical figures
- Produced by: Prescott Woodbury Baston Sr. Woody Baston
- Country: United States
- Introduced: 1938 in Arlington, MA
- Discontinued: 2013; 13 years ago

Sebastian Miniatures are a series of small ceramic sculptures or figurines first produced by Prescott Woodbury Baston Sr. (died 1984) in Arlington, Massachusetts in 1938.

His work includes historical figures such as George Washington, classic literary characters, and scenes of life, particularly in New England, United States, where Mr Baston created his pieces. Baston also created pieces specifically for businesses, such as in store promotions for products such as Jell-O. Baston continued to create pieces until his death in 1984. He made a self portrait. The Marblehead Historical Commission has a collection of his works.

Glenn S. Johnson published a collector's guide in 1980. Baston had a son and grandson named after him. His son took over the figurines business and it merged with Lance Corporation of Hudson, Massachusetts.
