= John Dwight (potter) =

English ceramic manufacturer

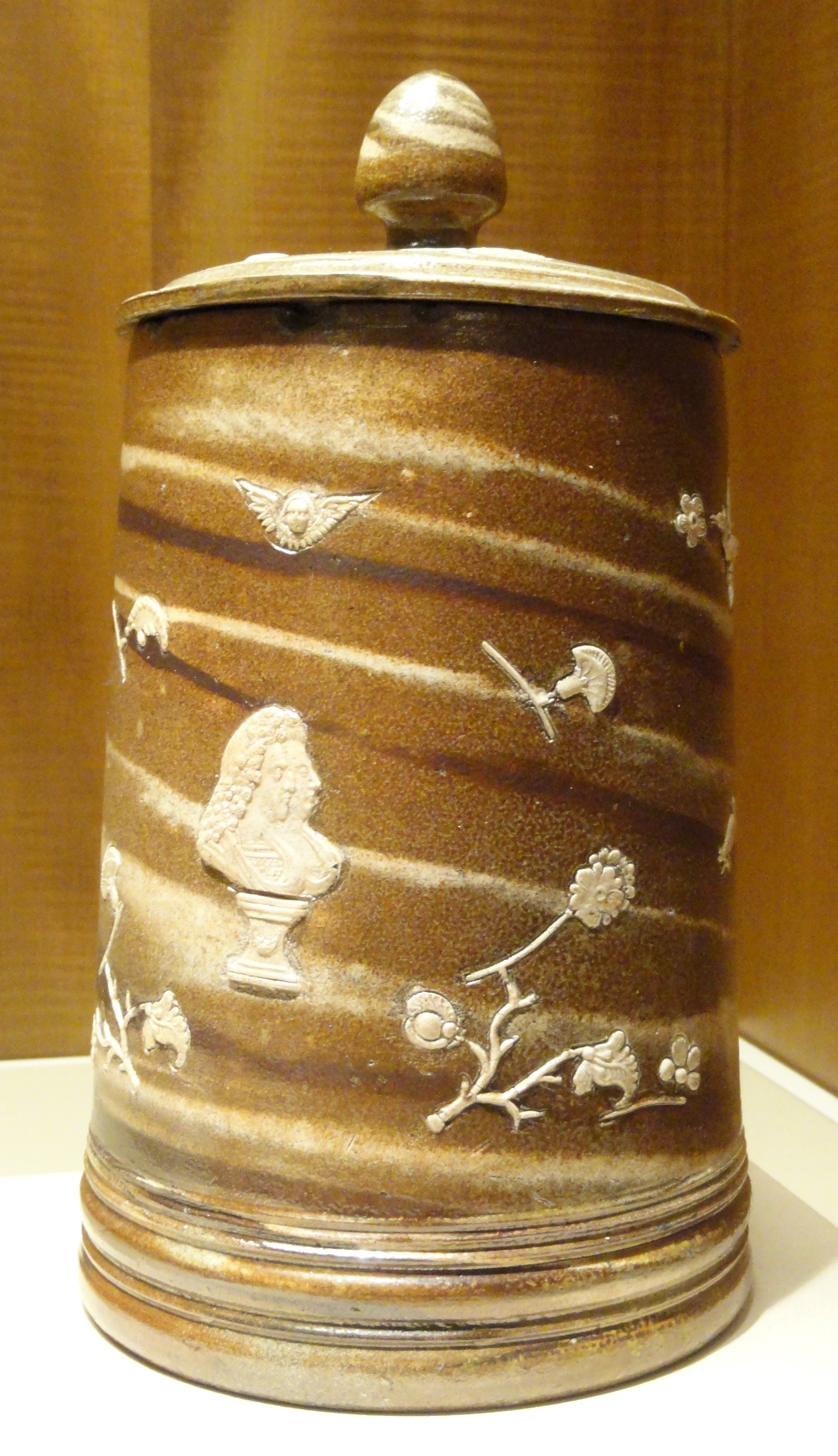
Covered tankard with embellishments, by John Dwight, Fulham, c. 1685-1690

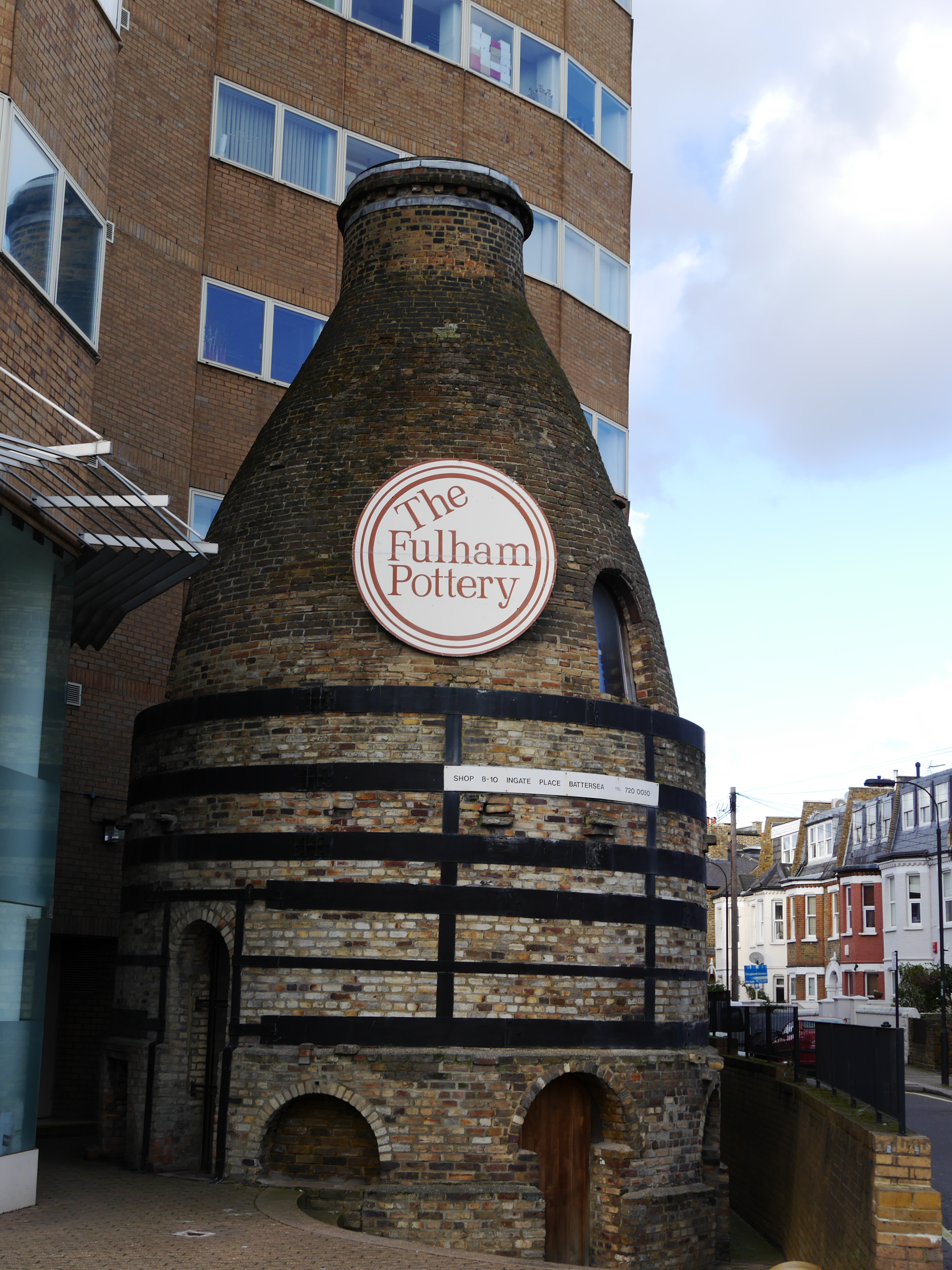
Fulham Pottery, 2014

John Dwight (died 1703) was an English ceramic manufacturer, who founded the Fulham Pottery in London and pioneered the production of stoneware in England.

== Early life ==
He is now thought to have been born in the years 1633 to 1636 at Todenham in Gloucestershire, the son of George Dwight, a farmer, and his wife, Joane Greenough. The family then, shortly afterwards, moved to North Hinksey. He studied at Oxford University, and worked as an assistant to Robert Boyle in the later 1650s.

In 1661 Dwight was appointed registrar and scribe to the diocese of Chester, and the same year he proceeded to the degree of B.C.L. at Christ Church, Oxford. He lived at Chester for some time, where he acted as secretary to successive bishops. At the end of the 1660s he fell out with John Wilkins, and turned to a new career.

== Potter ==
Dwight was living in Wigan at the end of the 1660s, when he sold his church posts, and invested in a career as a potter. He moved to London, where he was supported by Boyle and Robert Hooke. In 1672 he was granted a patent of 14 years for "the mistery of transparent earthenware, commonly known by the names of porcelain or china, and of stoneware, vulgarly called Cologne ware". He then established the Fulham Pottery. The staple output was brown stoneware.

Ambitious to replace all imported ceramics by his own products, Dwight experimented on a large scale. He also took out a second patent, and attempted to enforce it with extensive litigation: the targets of his legal action included John Philip Elers and the Wedgwood brothers of Burslem.

== Death ==
Dwight died in 1703, and his business was carried on by his descendants for some time, but with gradually diminishing success.

== Works ==
He is the earliest clearly documented maker of stoneware in England, although immigrant Dutch or German potters were probably doing so several decades before.

From the earliest days, Fulham was a significant manufacturer of salt-glazed stoneware, initially brown, but later white as well. But Dwight was a very early experimenter with porcelain, approaching the matter scientifically, keeping records of his trials. Excavations in the 1970s uncovered many of his coded test pieces, which the Museum of London feels able to call "porcelain", although such wares never seem to have been produced for sale.

The British Museum contains a number of the best of Dwight’s pieces, of including a bust of Prince Rupert. Other specimens are in the Victoria and Albert Museum.

On 3 March 1674 Dwight's six-year-old daughter Lydia died. In her memory he produced two ceramic sculptures, which are among the oldest examples of this type in Europe. In one she is standing in her burial clothes with a skull at her foot. Another half-length figure shows the girl dead in her bed, holding a posy of flowers. These were private images for the family of the dead girl.

In the same year he exhibited similar sculptures to the Royal Society, indicating that he was developing his method of manufacturing salt-glazed stoneware in order to enable it to be used for this purpose. Statues and figures are mentioned in his revised patent of 1684, although he does not seem to have produced any after this date, almost all the known examples having been made in the 1670s. The names of the modellers of the sculptures are not known. Most of the small number of examples in the London museums were made as one-off hand-modelled pieces, rather than using moulds to allow repetition, and seem to have come from a sale after Dwight's last descendant died in 1859.
