= Gallatin National Bank =

- Industry: Banking
- Predecessor: National Bank in the City of New York
- Founded: 1829
- Fate: Absorbed into Hanover National Bank (1912)
- Headquarters: New York City, New York
- Key people: Albert Gallatin; James Gallatin
- Products: Financial services

The Gallatin National Bank was a bank headquartered in New York City founded in 1829 by U.S. Treasury Secretary Albert Gallatin. In 1912, it was absorbed into the Hanover National Bank.

== History ==
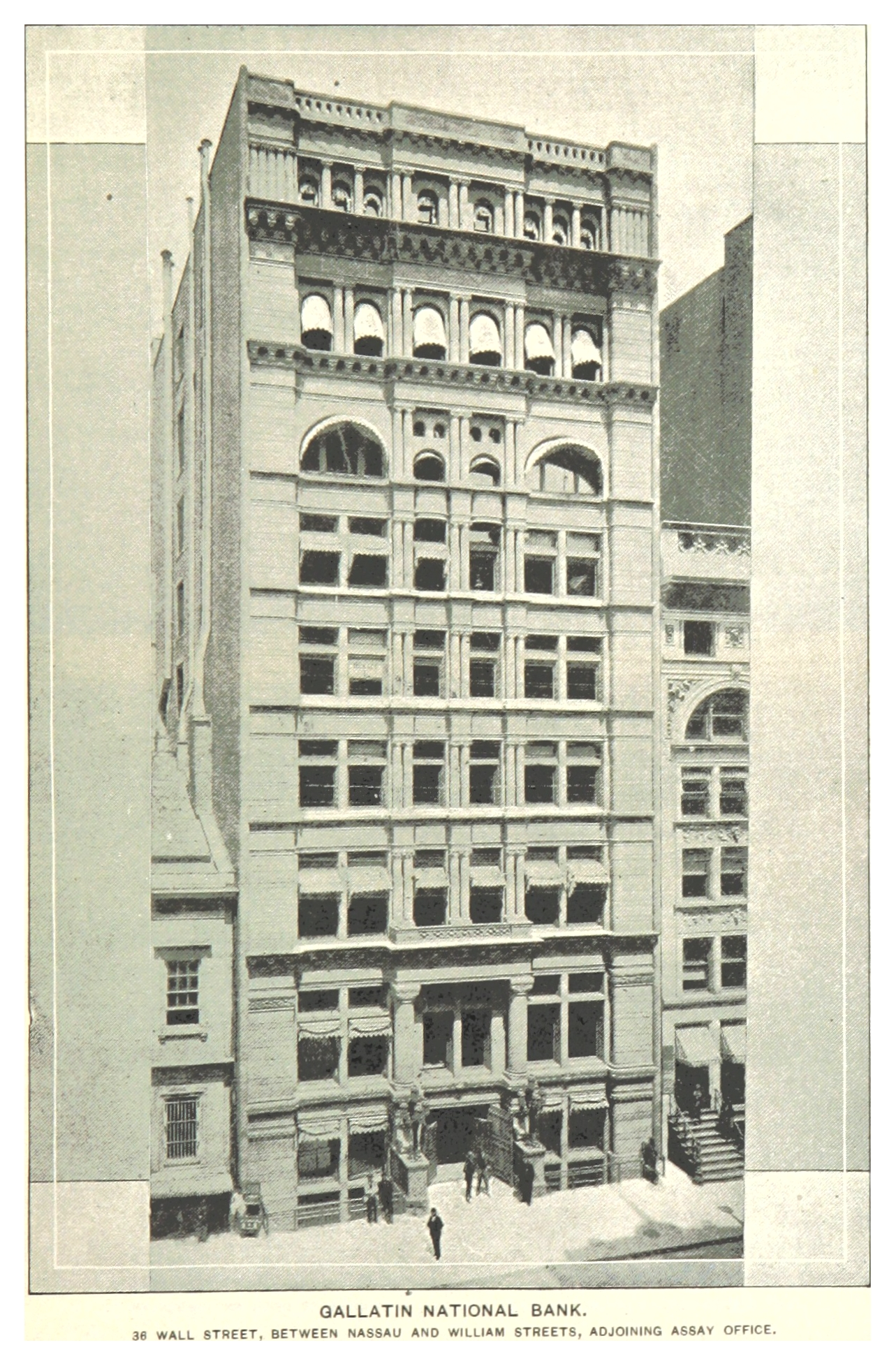
The Gallatin Bank Building at 38 Wall Street, between Nassau and William Streets

The bank was founded as the National Bank in the City of New York under a special charter in 1829 but did not begin business until 1831. It was organized by a group of New York businessmen including John Jacob Astor, who recruited Albert Gallatin, the former Treasury Secretary under President Thomas Jefferson, to serve as its first president. Its original capital was $750,000. Following Gallatin's retirement in 1839, he was succeeded as president by his son, James Gallatin.

In 1857, the capital of the bank was increased to $1,500,000 and, in 1865, when the bank entered the National system, its name was changed to the Gallatin National Bank of the City of New York to honor the involvement of the Gallatin family. The younger Gallatin served as president until 1868 when he was succeeded by Frederick D. Tappen, who served as president until his death in 1902. Tappen entered the bank in 1850 in a junior position and became "a leading figure in the financial history of New York during his presidency, having as President of the Clearing House taken the lead in guiding the banks of the city through the panic of 1893. By 1878, however, the capital of the bank was reduced to $1,000,000 although it continuously paid dividends since 1832 until it was absorbed in 1912.

In 1887, the Bank opened the Gallatin Bank Building at 36 Wall Street on land purchased after the James Gallatin resigned in 1868. The building was extant for forty-two years until it was torn down to make room for 40 Wall Street, a new building completed by the Bank of the Manhattan Company in late 1929, which was the tallest office building in the world when finished. In 1898, Arthur W. Sherman, for many years the cashier of the Gallatin National died at the Metropolitan Club. Following Tappen's death in 1902, he was succeeded by Samuel Woolverton, who joined Gallatin as cashier in 1898. Woolverton was also elected Secretary of the New York Clearing House in 1908.

=== Hanover National Bank ===
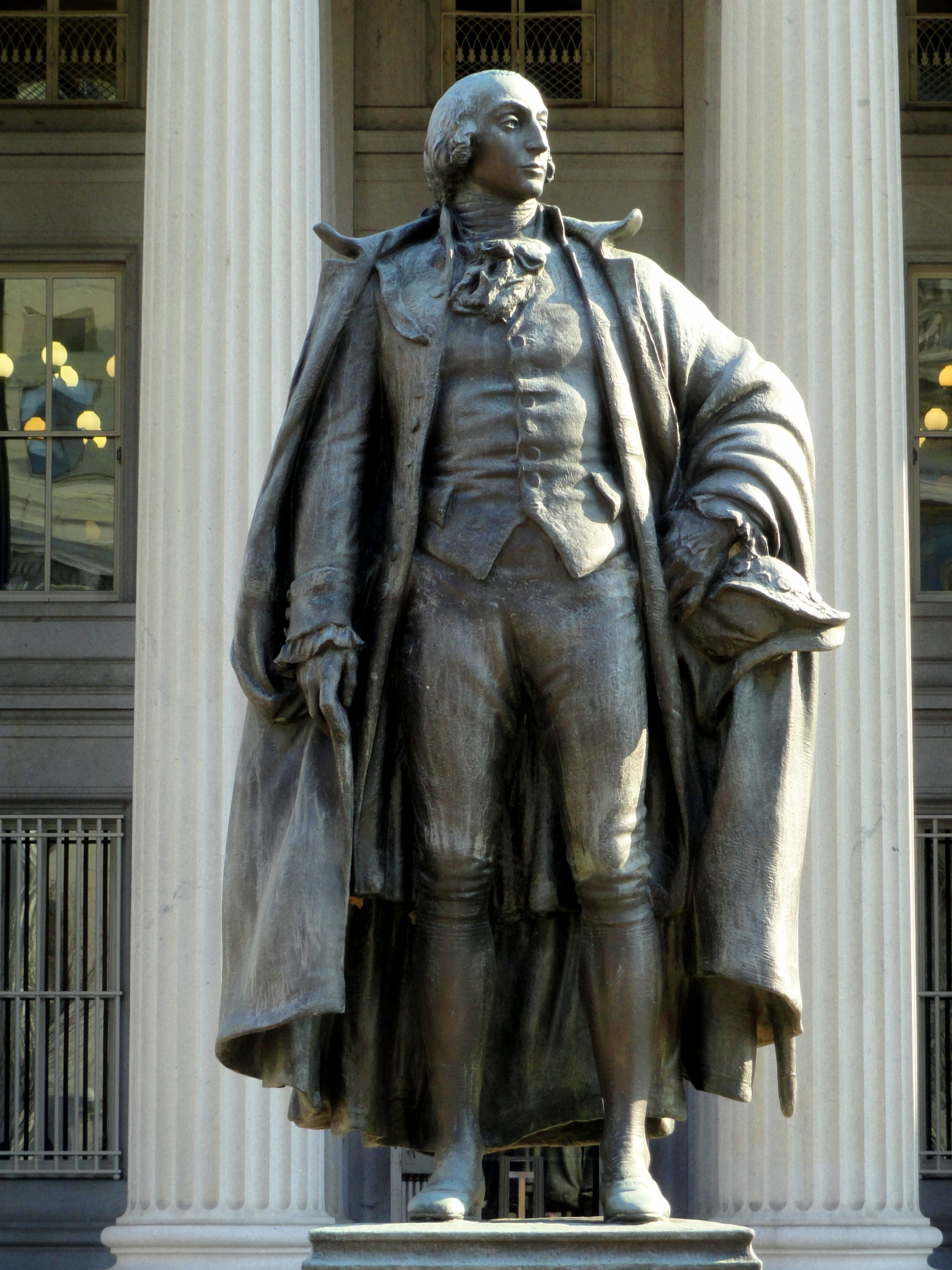
Statute of Albert Gallatin by James Earle Fraser in front of the United States Treasury Building

In 1912, the Hanover National Bank absorbed the Gallatin National Bank, which combined to become one of the country's largest. At the time of the merger, the Hanover had deposits of approximately $100,000,000 and its capital and surplus totaled $16,500,000 whereas the Gallatin had capital of $1,000,000, with surplus of $2,000,000 and deposits of more than $7,000,000. (Note: In 1912, the directors of the Gallatin National Bank were: Adrian Iselin Jr., Frederic W. Stevens (a grandson of Albert Gallatin), W. Emlen Roosevelt, Charles A. Peabody, Samuel Woolverton, Charles H. Tweed, Thomas Denny, and the official staff consisted of: Samuel Woolverton as President, Adrian Iselin Jr. as Vice President, George E. Lewis as Cashier and Howell T. Manson as Assistant Cashier.) Upon the consolidation, Gallatin's president, Samuel Woolverton, became a vice president of Hanover, and a director, along with Ernest Iselin (representing the Iselin family interests) (Note: The Iselin family were related to the Gallatin family in that Adrian Iselin's father-in-law (Columbus O'Donnell) and James Gallatin both married daughters of Louis Pascault, Marquis de Poleon.) and Emlen Roosevelt.

=== Leadership ===
- Albert Gallatin (president: 1829–1839)
- James Gallatin (president: 1839–1868)
- Frederick D. Tappen (president: 1868–1902)
- Samuel Woolverton (president: 1902–1912)
