= Pascault =

Pascault is a surname of French origin coming from the Dauphiné region in the French Alps. Notable people with the surname include:

- Louis Pascault, Marquis de Poleon (1749-1824), French-American aristocrat
- Yadira Pascault Orozco, French-Mexican actress, writer, producer and sitarist
