= Frederick D. Tappen =

President of the Gallatin National Bank
- In office 1868–1902
- Preceded by: James Gallatin
- Succeeded by: Samuel Woolverton

Personal details
- Born: Frederick Dobbs Tappen; January 29, 1829 New York City
- Died: February 28, 1902 (aged 73) Lakewood, New Jersey
- Spouse: Sarah Ann Brown Littell (m. 1851)
- Parent: Charles Barclay Tappen
- Education: Columbia College Grammar School
- Alma mater: New York University

Frederick Dobbs Tappen (January 29, 1829 – February 28, 1902) was an American banker who was president of the Gallatin National Bank.

== Early life ==
Tappen was born in New York City on January 29, 1829. He was one of eleven children of Col. Charles Barclay Tappen (1796–1893), a veteran of the War of 1812 who was "a famous architect in his day" and was Commissioner of Public Works in New York City from 1835 to 1838. Reportedly, "the family was of old Holland stock that fled to England to escape the Spanish persecutions in the Netherlands, while the first American ancestor" came to the United States "in 1630 and settled at Fort Orange, now Albany".

He prepared for college at the Columbia College Grammar School and then entered New York University from where he graduated in 1849.

== Career ==
Tappen began working for the National Bank in the City of New York as specie clerk on November 12, 1850. He steadily advanced, becoming bookkeeper, receiving teller, paying teller, assistant cashier, and cashier in October 1857. In 1865, the name of the bank was changed to the Gallatin National Bank to honor its first president, former U.S. Treasury Secretary Albert Gallatin. Following the retirement of Gallatin's son James Gallatin as president in 1868, Tappen assumed the presidency of the Gallatin National Bank, a role he served until his death in 1902. In 1899, he was elected a trustee of the Fifth Avenue Trust Company.

He served as chairman of the Loan Committee of the New York Clearing House during the panic of 1873, 1884, 1890 and 1893. For his services on the Committee, he was awarded a silver tankard in 1893 that had been originally presented to Sir John Houblon, first Governor of the Bank of England. In 1892, he was elected a trustee and made treasurer of the Grant Monument Association, which constructed Grant's Tomb.

== Personal life ==
In 1851, Tappen was married to Sarah Ann Brown Littell (1830–1912), a daughter of Caleb Maxwell Littell and Mary Ross (née Clark) Littell. Together, they lived at 49 East 68th Street, (Note: In 1897, as trustee of the estate of Ellen E. Ward, he sold the neighboring 4-story brownstone residence at 45 East 68th Street for about $50,000 cash to Thomas H. Barber.) and were the parents of several children, including:

- Josephine Hilyard Tappen (1852–1889), who married Clarence Brooks, a son of Elisha Brooks, in 1876.
- Albert Howe Tappen (1855–1881), who died unmarried at age 25.
- Grace Tappen (b. c. 1860), who married George Ingraham Seney Jr. (1860–1916), son of George I. Seney, in 1883.
- Ellen Stuart Tappen (b. c. 1866), who married Isaac E. Adams in 1886. She later married Adrien B. Herzog.

After a brief illness, Tappen died at Lakewood, New Jersey on February 28, 1902. After a funeral at the All Souls Episcopal Church on Madison Avenue, (Note: There were twenty-two honorary pallbearers at his funeral, the first seventeen of which were present at the funeral: J. Pierpont Morgan, Adrian Iselin Jr., George F. Baker (President of the First National Bank), George Crocker, Elbridge T. Gerry, J. Edward Simmons (President of the Fourth National Bank), James W. Alexander (President of the Equitable Life Assurance Society, Levi P. Morton (former Governor of New York), Stephen Baker (President of the Bank of the Manhattan Company), Col. Joel B. Erhardt, Samuel G. Bayne (President of the Seaboard National Bank), Brayton Ives (President of the Metropolitan Trust Company), George R. Sheldon, Thatcher M. Adams, A. H. Stevens (Vice President of the Gallatin National Bank), Dr. E. L. Keyes, William A. Nash (President of the Corn Exchange Bank), George G. Williams (President of the Chemical National Bank), Cornelius N. Bliss, O. D. Munn, E. H. Perkins Jr. (President of the Importers' and Traders' National Bank), and William Waldorf Astor.) he was interred at Trinity Church Cemetery at 152nd Street in Manhattan.
