= Love and Psyche (David) =

Painting by Jacques-Louis David

Cupid and Psyche
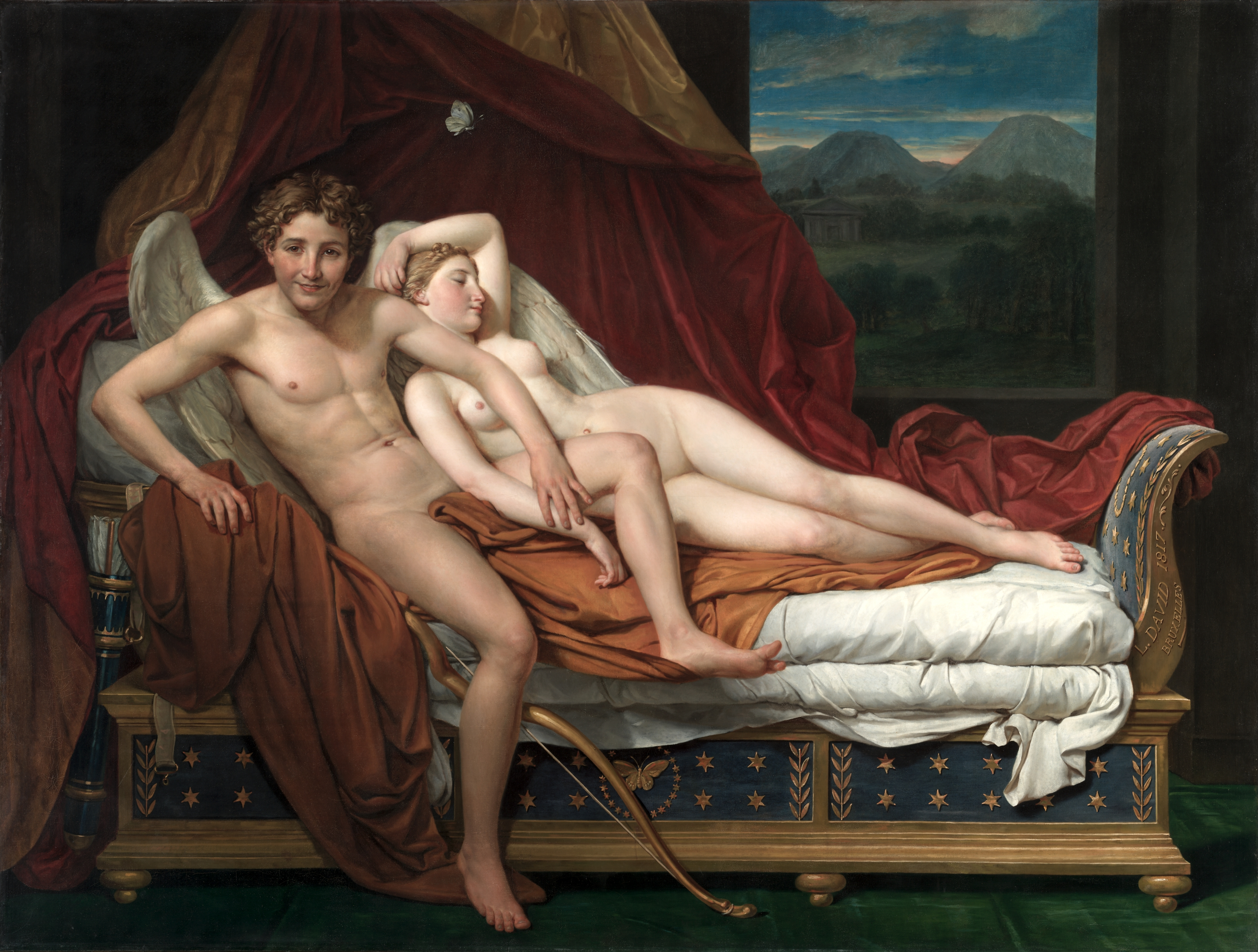
- Artist: Jacques-Louis David
- Year: 1817
- Dimensions: 184 cm (72 in) × 242 cm (95 in)
- Location: Cleveland Museum of Art

Love and Psyche or Cupid and Psyche is an 1817 painting by Jacques-Louis David, now in the Cleveland Museum of Art. It shows Cupid and Psyche. It was produced during David's exile in Brussels, for the patron and collector Gian Battista Sommariva. On its first exhibition at the museum in Brussels, it surprised viewers with its realist treatment of the figure of Cupid. Critics generally saw the painting's unconventional style and realistic depiction of Cupid as proof of David's decline while in exile, but art historians have come to see the work as a deliberate departure from traditional methods of representing mythological figures.

== Background ==
=== Exile ===
David began planning Love and Psyche in Paris in 1813, then completed it while in exile in Brussels, following Napoleon's fall from power. It was the first painting that David finished in exile. Louis XVIII had offered David a pardon for his activities during the Revolution, but the painter decided instead to enter exile in Brussels. Up to this time, David had often been regarded as an imitator of ancient art. His typical style was what the German art historian Winckelmann described as the “beau ideal.” This style focused on an idealized image of bodies. David's style had also previously been characterized by its simplicity. Love and Psyche dramatically deviates from these traits. When it debuted in Paris, many viewers saw it as a symbol of the negative effect of David's exile.

=== Patronage and inspiration ===
This painting was made for the collection of Sommariva, who had gained his wealth quickly through dubious financial operations. Sommariva likely assembled his collection in order to display his wealth and enhance his reputation.

According to David's correspondence, he had become interested in the story of Cupid and Psyche and wanted put a new twist on an overused theme through his use of realism. James Gallatin, the 17-year-old son of an American diplomat, posed nude for the painting, which may explain the awkward teenage look of Cupid.

This painting is based on a myth that comes from Apuleius's Metamorphoses. According to the story, Psyche is a beautiful mortal, who is punished for her beauty by Venus, who is jealous of her beauty. Her punishment is left up to Venus's son Cupid, but he falls in love with Psyche. Cupid rescues Psyche from her ultimate demise by capturing her and bringing her to his castle. He keeps his identity secret in order not to upset his mother. Every night Cupid stays with Psyche and leaves in the morning before she wakes up. Psyche begins to wonder who he is, and tries to use a lamp to discover his true identity. Cupid catches her in this act and abandons her. In Apuleius's story, the remainder of the myth is about Psyche trying to regain Cupid's love. David's picture captures the moment in the morning when Cupid sneaks off after spending the night with her. The art historian Mary Vidal has argued that David's painting engages with the ambiguity and reversals of meaning in Apuleius's original work, recreating the author's “deceptive approach to an allegory.”

== Painting details ==
The painting features Cupid sneaking off as Psyche peacefully sleeps in the background. The setting is decorative and cluttered, as David tries to communicate the circumstances of Psyche's imprisonment. The dark, deep colors and the overwhelming canopy contrast with the setting in the background. The landscape, according to Mary Vidal, symbolizes a “journey, renewal and illumination,” which contrasts with Psyche's circumstances. The bodies of both Cupid and Psyche are illuminated in contrast with the dark colors of the background, further highlighting their unidealized appearance.

David began the project prior to his exile, and he made numerous changes to his design after arriving in Brussels. He made significant alterations after the design was transferred to canvas, which was unusual. The biggest change was the decoration of the interior in the Empire style, which may have served as a remembrance of the time when Napoleon was in power.

There is a small detail of a butterfly above Psyche. The flying butterfly symbolizes, according to the art historian Issa Lampe, both “death and transcendence," serving as a commentary on Cupid's departure from Psyche every morning.

The most striking detail of this painting is the hyper-realistic depiction of Cupid's body and his expression. David's original study shows he always intended to paint Cupid in this manner, even before his exile. Cupid's wings continue this style, as they are worn out and ugly, making Cupid seem to be a part of the mortal realm rather than godly.

== Analysis ==
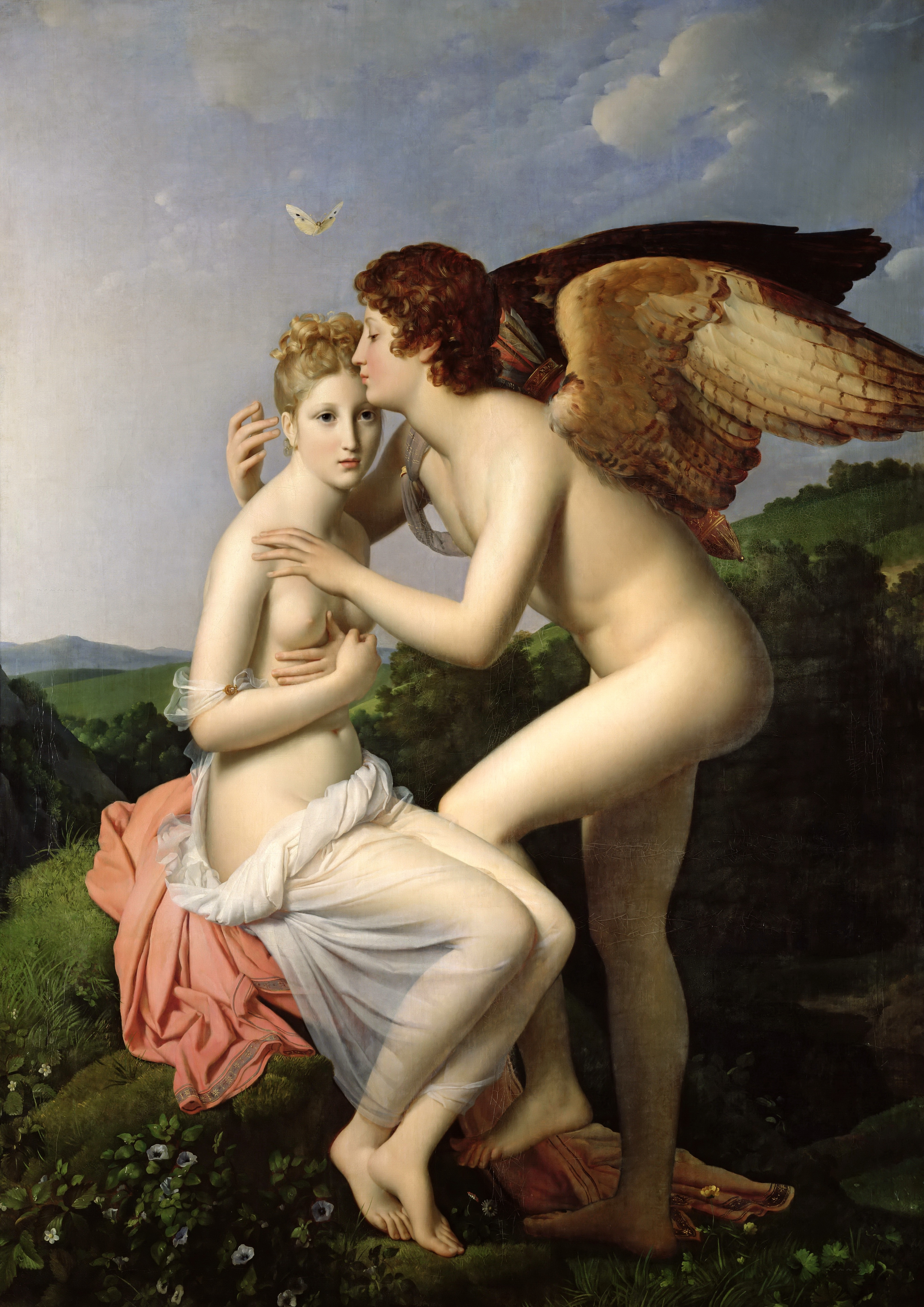
Gerard Cupid and Psyche (1798)

Analyses of the painting typically focus on the realistic portrayal of Cupid, which deviates from the traditional treatment of the myth. François Gérard's Cupid and Psyche from 1798 is sometimes cited as a comparison. In Gérard's work, both characters are painted in an idealized way that emphasizes the purity of young love. Traditional depictions of the myth also usually did not implicate Cupid and portrayed him as largely innocent and beautiful. Art historians have also compared David's painting to François Édouard Picot's Amor and Psyche (1817), which depicts the same moment of Cupid leaving, but in an idealized manner.

In David's version, Cupid appears to be sinister while Psyche is vulnerable, suggesting a slightly perverted relationship between the two. Cupid seems almost unhealthy; his complexion is muddied, and his expression and body language seem unloving, bordering on hostile, and his body is scrawny, a far cry from the idealized bodies typical of the time. Cupid's positioning and gaze break the separation between the subject and the viewer. He appears to step out of the painting into reality and his gaze is directed at the viewer. This creates, according to the art historian Dorothy Johnson, an uncomfortable sensation when looking at the painting as it “makes the viewers complicit in this power dynamic” between Cupid and Psyche.

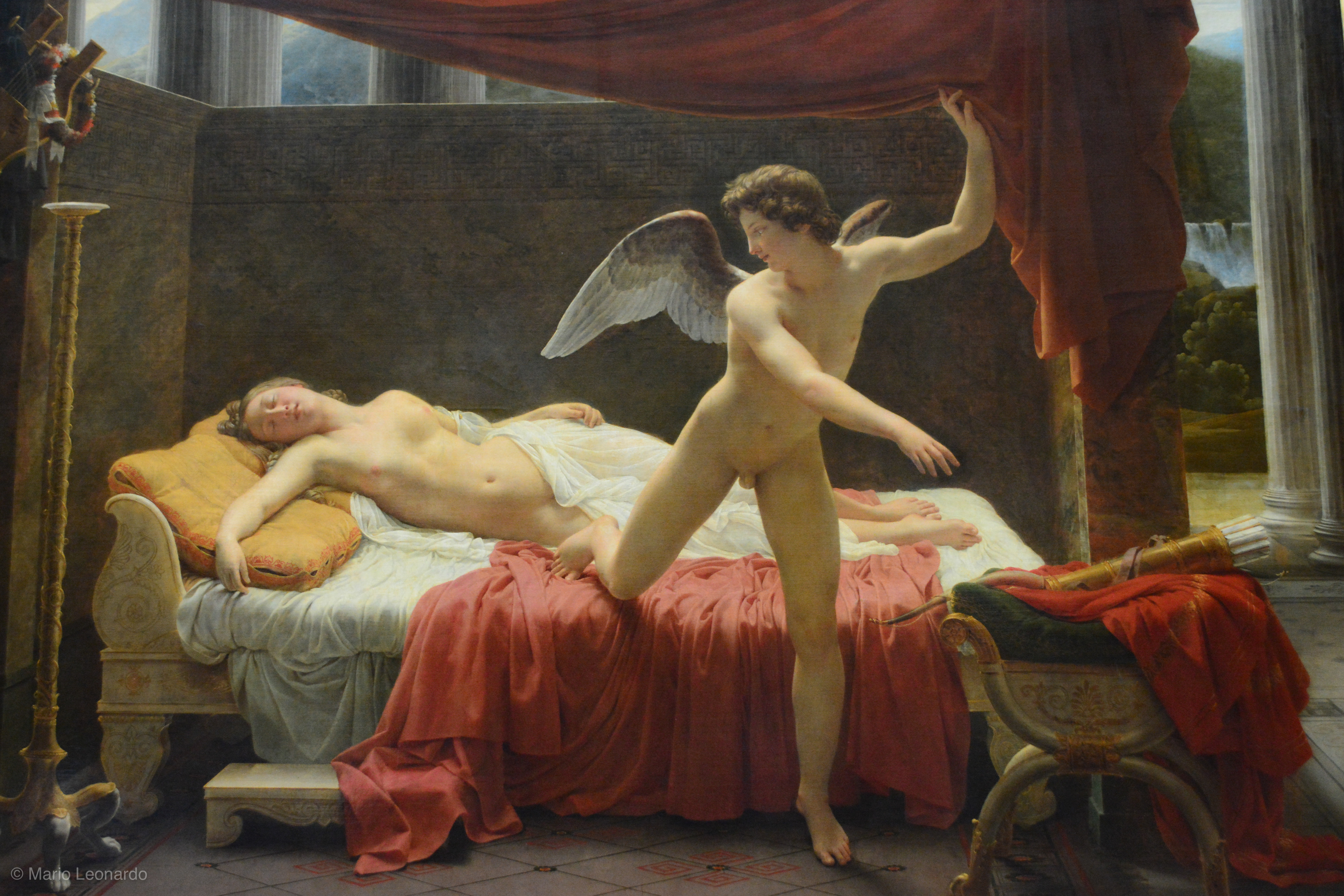
Picot, Amor and Psyche (1817)

Psyche's pose has also been compared with Titian and Correggio's depictions of reclining goddesses. Her facial expression is innocent and beautiful. She is still asleep, emphasizing her vulnerability. The contrast between sweet Psyche and vulgar Cupid is important to the novelty that art historians have seen in the painting.

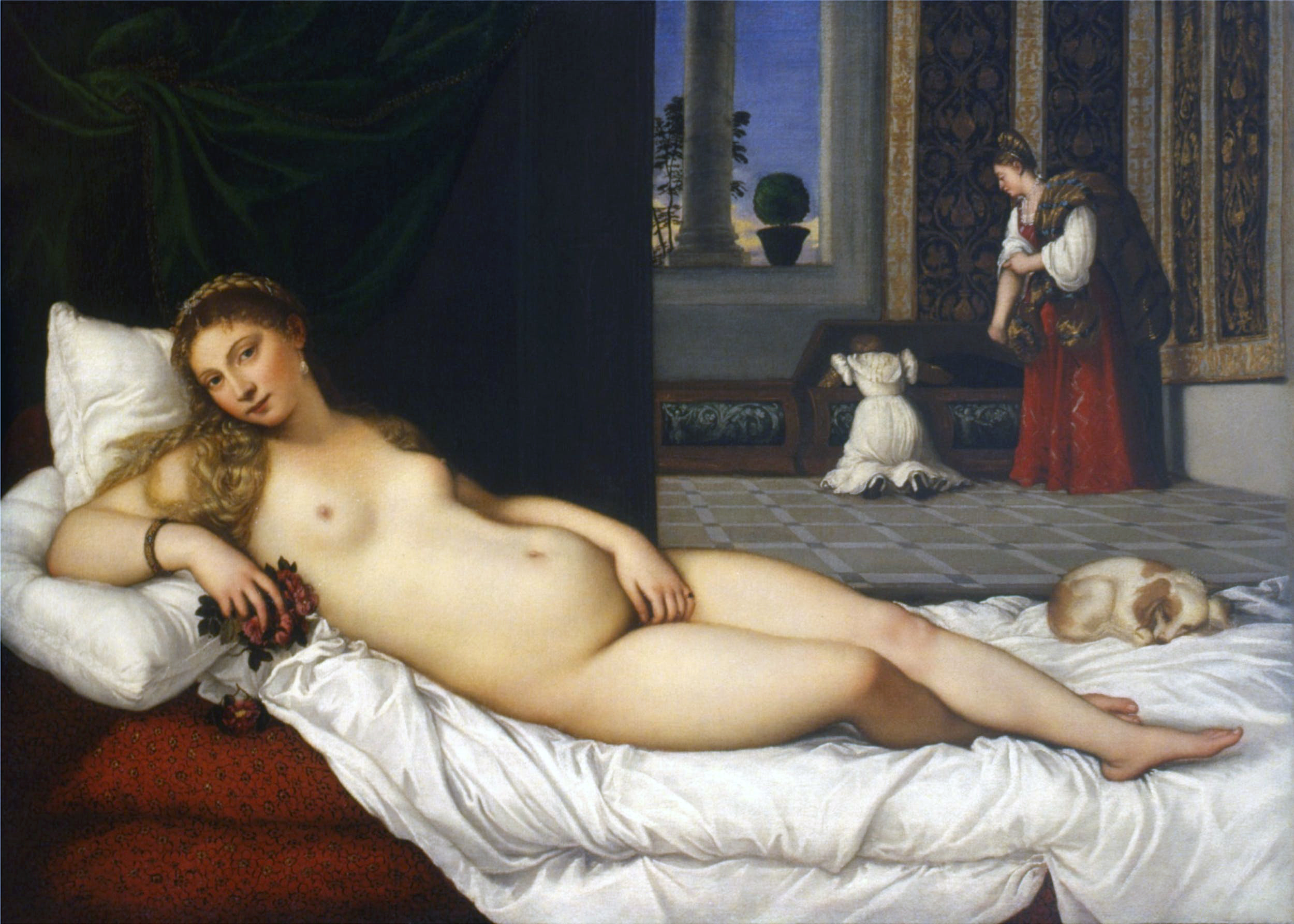
Titian Venus of Urbino (1538): Example of Recumbent Goddess

== Criticism ==
Two supportive articles about the painting appeared when it was first shown, but they were likely influenced by David himself. Both of them focused on the realism, one article saying it was a "purely historical" approach to mythology. When put into contrast with Picot's work, the realism was further applauded by some.

The overwhelming response, however, was negative. The ruling class preferred more idealized works, as the realism was seen as immoral for hinting at sexual undertones. Gros, who was otherwise a known supporter of David, said that “the head of Amor has a somewhat faun-like character, the hands are somewhat dark and above all not refined enough.” Other critics were confused by the deviation from Cupid's typical appearance and were disturbed by the distortion of it.

== See also ==
- List of paintings by Jacques-Louis David
- Cupid and Psyche (disambiguation)

== Bibliography ==
- Philippe Bordes, David, Empire to Exile, New Haven, Yale University press, 2005 (ISBN 0-300-12346-9)
- Antoine Schnapper (ed.) and Arlette Sérullaz, Jacques-Louis David 1748–1825 : catalogue de l'exposition rétrospective Louvre-Versailles 1989–1990, Paris, Réunion des Musées nationaux, 1989 (ISBN 2711823261)
- Sophie Monneret, David et le néoclassicisme, Paris, Terrail, 1998 (ISBN 2879391865)
- Simon Lee, David, Paris, Phaidon, 2002 (ISBN 0714891053)
- Johnson, Dorothy. Jacques-Louis David: Art in Metamorphosis. New Jersey: Princeton University Press, 1993
- Lampe, Issa. “Repainting Love Leaving Psyche: David's Memorial to an Empire Past.” in David after David, edited by Mark Ledbury, 108–121. Massachusetts: Sterling and Francine Art Institute, 2007
- Francis, Henry. “Jacques Louis David: Cupid and Psyche.” The Bulletin of the Cleveland Museum of Art 50, no. 2 (1963): 29–34. JSTOR 25151934
- Vidal, Mary. “‘With a Pretty Whisper’: Deception and Transformation in David's Cupid and Psyche and Apuleius's Metamorphoses.” Wiley Online Library 22, no. 2 (2003): 214–243. https://doi.org/10.1111/1467-8365.00150
