= Yasuo Matsui =

American architect

- Yasuo Matsui in 1930
- Born: 1877; Japan
- Died: 1962 (aged 84–85)
- Education: University of California, MIT
- Occupation: Architect
- Practice: F.H. Dewey & Company
- Buildings: 40 Wall Street, Empire State Building, Starrett-Lehigh Building

Yasuo Matsui (1877 – 1962) was a prominent 20th-century Japanese-American architect.

== Early years ==
Immigrating to the United States from Japan in 1902, Matsui attended the University of California and afterward worked for Ernest Flagg. He was one of the architects who worked on the Empire State Building. He eventually rose to the position of President at F.H. Dewey & Company, an architectural firm, which was involved with many prominent skyscraper projects on the East Coast. Their most prominent project was the 71-story 40 Wall Street building. He also designed the Japanese Pavilion at the 1939 World's Fair.

== World War II ==
Along with other prominent Japanese living throughout the United States, Matsui was arrested by the FBI after the bombing of Pearl Harbor. He was taken to Ellis Island on December 8, 1941, and interned for two months until he was paroled in February 1942. For the rest of the war his freedom to travel was curtailed, he had to report his activities to the federal government every month, and he was barred from owning a camera. He was released from parole in October 1945.

== Death ==
He died a naturalized American citizen in 1962. He was predeceased by his daughter, Margaret, who died on July 19, 1942, at the age of 29. Margaret was employed by Life, and was at the time of her death married to Life photographer John Phillips.

== Bibliography ==
- Matsui, Yasuo (1930-03-01). "Architect Explains Tower Height: finds observatory still among highest of skyscrapers standing today" (PDF). The New York Sun. Fultonhistory.com. Archived from the original (PDF) on 2019-04-03.

== See also ==
- Higher: A Historic Race to the Sky and the Making of a City
