= 40 Wall Street =

Office skyscraper in Manhattan, New York

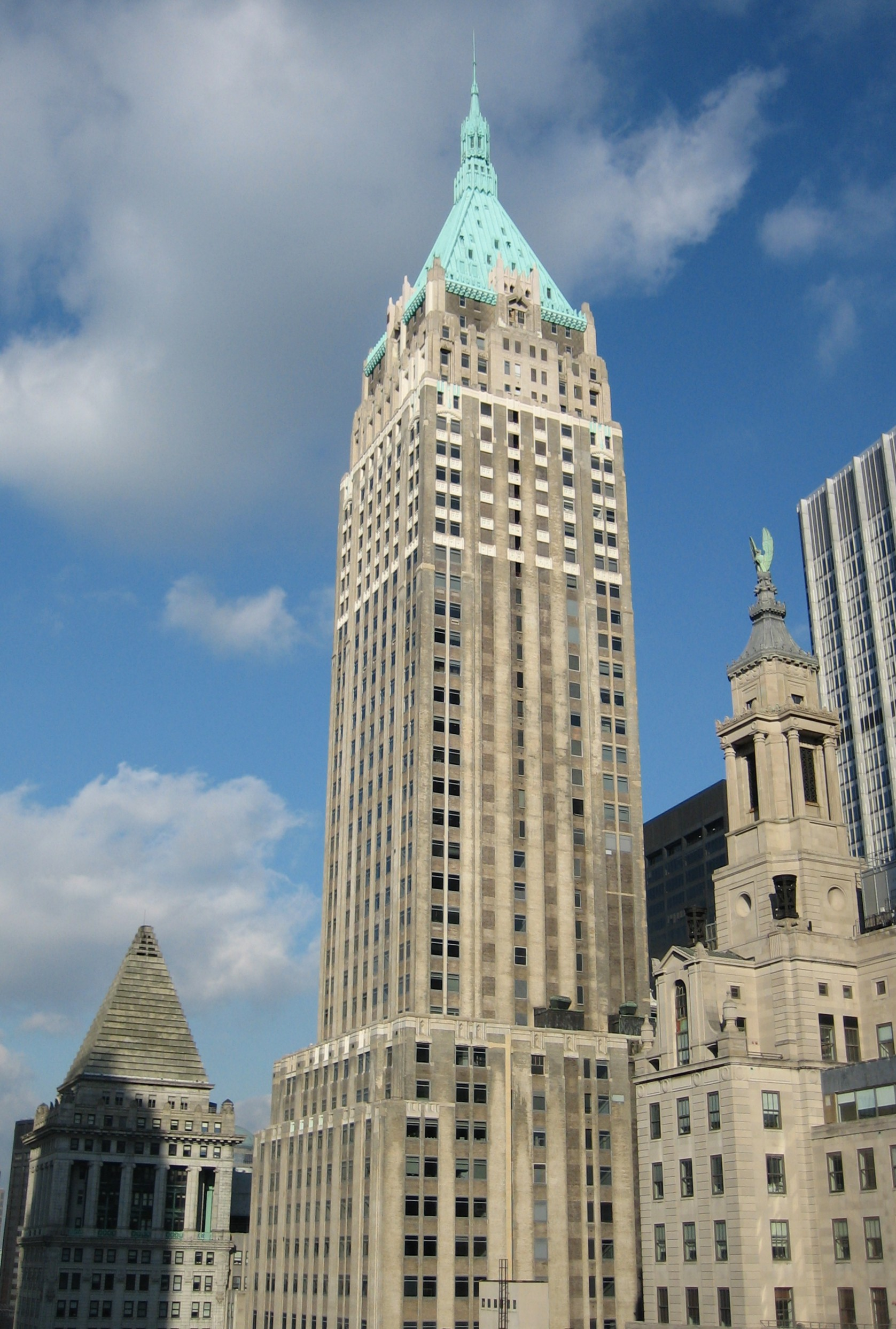
- 40 Wall Street in December 2005
- Alternative names: Trump Building, Manhattan Company Building

Record height
- Tallest in the world from May 1, 1930 to May 27, 1930 (Note: Although 40 Wall Street was the world's tallest completed building in May 1930, the incomplete Chrysler Building had already reached its full height in 1929.)^{[I]}
- Preceded by: Woolworth Building
- Surpassed by: Chrysler Building

General information
- Type: Office building
- Architectural style: Neo-Gothic
- Location: 40 Wall Street; Manhattan, New York, U.S.
- Coordinates: 40°42′25″N 74°00′35″W
- Construction started: May 1929; 97 years ago
- Topped-out: November 13, 1929; 96 years ago
- Completed: May 1, 1930; 96 years ago
- Opening: May 26, 1930; 96 years ago
- Owner: 40 Wall Street Holdings Corp
- Landlord: The Trump Organization

Height
- Architectural: 927 ft (283 m)
- Top floor: 836 ft (255 m)

Technical details
- Floor count: 70 (+2 below ground)
- Floor area: 1,111,675 ft^{2} (103,278.0 m^{2})
- Lifts/elevators: 36

Design and construction
- Architects: H. Craig Severance (main architect); Yasuo Matsui (associate architect); Shreve & Lamb (consulting architect)

Website
- 40wallstreet.com
- Manhattan Company Building
- U.S. National Register of Historic Places
- U.S. Historic district – Contributing property
- New York State Register of Historic Places
- New York City Landmark
- Location: 40 Wall Street, New York, NY
- Area: less than one acre
- Built: 1929–1930
- Architects: H. Craig Severance, Yasuo Matsui, et al.
- Architectural style: Skyscraper
- Part of: Wall Street Historic District (ID07000063)
- NRHP reference No.: 00000577
- NYSRHP No.: 06101.008193
- NYCL No.: 1936

Significant dates
- Added to NRHP: June 16, 2000
- Designated CP: February 20, 2007
- Designated NYSRHP: April 5, 2000
- Designated NYCL: December 12, 1995

40 Wall Street (also the Trump Building; formerly the Bank of Manhattan Trust Building and Manhattan Company Building) is a 927-foot-tall (283 m) neo-Gothic skyscraper on Wall Street between Nassau and William streets in the Financial District of Manhattan in New York City, New York, U.S. Erected in 1929–1930 as the headquarters of the Manhattan Company, the building was designed by H. Craig Severance with Yasuo Matsui and Shreve & Lamb. The building is a New York City designated landmark and is listed on the National Register of Historic Places (NRHP); it is also a contributing property to the Wall Street Historic District, an NRHP district.

The building is on an L-shaped site. While the lower section has a facade of limestone, the upper stories incorporate a buff-colored brick facade and contain numerous setbacks. The facade also includes spandrels between the windows on each story, which are recessed behind the vertical piers on the facade. At the top of the building is a pyramid with a spire at its pinnacle. Inside, the lower floors contained the Manhattan Company's double-height banking room, a board room, a trading floor, and two basements with vaults. The remaining stories were rented to tenants; there were private clubs on several floors, as well as an observation deck on the 69th and 70th floors.

Plans for 40 Wall Street were revealed in April 1929, with the Manhattan Company as the primary tenant, and the structure was opened on May 26, 1930. 40 Wall Street and the Chrysler Building competed for the distinction of world's tallest building at the time of both buildings' construction; the Chrysler Building ultimately won that title. 40 Wall Street initially had low tenancy rates due to the Great Depression and was not fully occupied until 1944. Ownership of the building and the land underneath it, as well as the leasehold on the building, has changed several times throughout its history. Since 1982, the building has been owned by two German companies. The leasehold was held by interests on behalf of Philippine dictator Ferdinand Marcos in the mid-1980s. A company controlled by developer and later U.S. president Donald Trump bought the lease in 1995.

== Site ==
40 Wall Street is in the Financial District of Manhattan in New York City, New York, U.S. It occupies the middle of the block bounded by Pine Street to the north, William Street to the east, Wall Street to the south, and Nassau Street to the west. The site is L-shaped, with a longer facade on Pine Street than on Wall Street. The lot measures 209 feet (64 m) on Pine Street and 150 ft (46 m) on Wall Street. Originally, the site measured 194 ft (59 m) on Pine Street and 150 feet on Wall Street. The lot has a total area of 34,360 square feet (3,192 m^{2}).

40 Wall Street is surrounded by several buildings, including Federal Hall and 30 Wall Street to the west; 44 Wall Street and 48 Wall Street to the east; 55 Wall Street to the southeast; 28 Liberty Street to the north; and 23 Wall Street and 15 Broad Street to the south. The site slopes down southward so that the Pine Street entrance is on the second floor while the Wall Street entrance is on the first floor.

Prior to the current building's completion, the site was occupied by numerous smaller office buildings. The southern part of the site was occupied by the eight-story Gallatin Bank Building at 34–36 Wall Street, designed by Cady, Berg & See and completed in 1887; the nine-story Marshall Field Building at 38 Wall Street; the Manhattan Company's original headquarters at 40 Wall Street; and a 13-story building to the east. The northern portion contained a 13-story building at 25 Pine Street, a 12-story building at 27–29 Pine Street, and the 13-story Redmond Building at 31–33 Pine Street.

== Architecture ==
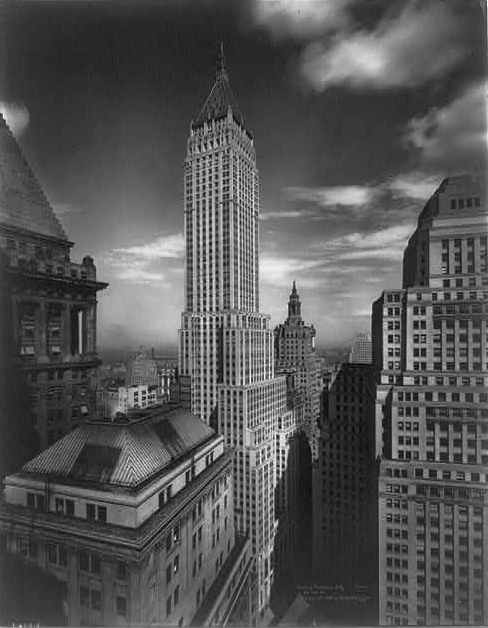
Photo of the Manhattan Company Building c. 1930

The building was designed by lead architect H. Craig Severance, associate architect Yasuo Matsui, and consulting architects Shreve & Lamb. Moran & Proctor were consulting engineers for the foundation, the Starrett Corporation was the builder, and Purdy and Henderson were the structural engineers. The interior was designed by Morrell Smith with Walker & Gillette. Many engineers and contractors were involved in various other aspects of the building's construction.

The New York City Landmarks Preservation Commission has described 40 Wall Street's facade as having "modernized French Gothic" features. The building's massing largely conforms to the Art Deco style, though there are also abstract shapes and elements of classical architecture. According to art history professor Daniel M. Abramson, the classically-styled details at the base were intended to provide "context and support", while the Gothic-style roof was intended to emphasize the building's height. 40 Wall Street is 70 stories tall, with two additional basement stories. (Note: According to the New York City Department of City Planning, the building contains 63 stories.) The building's pinnacle reaches 927 feet (283 m), which made it the world's tallest building for one month upon its completion.

=== Form ===
40 Wall Street, like many other early-20th-century skyscrapers in New York City, is designed as a freestanding tower, rising separately from all adjacent buildings. 40 Wall Street is one of several skyscrapers in the city that have pyramidal roofs, along with the Metropolitan Life Insurance Company Tower, 14 Wall Street, Woolworth Building, Consolidated Edison Building, and Thurgood Marshall United States Courthouse. The building is articulated into three horizontal sections similar to the components of a column, namely a base, shaft, and capital. The floors at the six-story base cover the entire L-shaped lot, while the 7th through 35th stories (making up the middle section) are shaped in a "U", with two wings of different lengths facing west. The 7th through 35th stories occupy nearly the entire lot. Above the 35th story, the building rises as a smaller, square tower through the 62nd story.

40 Wall Street has several setbacks to conform with New York City's 1916 Zoning Resolution. On the Wall Street side, the central portion of the facade is recessed through the 26th floor, while symmetrical pavilions project slightly on either side, with setbacks above the 17th, 19th, and 21st floors. The entire Wall Street facade has setbacks above the 26th, 33rd, and 35th floors. The Pine Street facade is asymmetrical, with the western pavilion being much longer; this facade has a setback above the 12th, 17th, 19th, 23rd, 26th, 28th, and 29th floors. The projecting pavilions on both sides are connected at the eighth floor by a dormer.

The building's west-facing wings are of different lengths; the northern wing is significantly longer and has cooling systems atop it, but both wings have minor setbacks above the 26th and 33rd floors, and rise only to the 35th floor. The eastern facade does not have any setbacks below the 35th story.

=== Facade ===
40 Wall Street's exterior curtain wall is composed of two layers of brick; the inner layer provides fireproofing, while the outer layer is the exterior cladding. In general, the facade is composed of buff-colored brick, as well as decorative elements made of terracotta and buff brick. The vertical bays, which contain the building's windows, are separated by piers. The piers are flat, a characteristic of the Art Deco style. Spandrel panels, which separate the rows of windows on each floor, are generally recessed behind the piers; the spandrels are generally darker on upper stories. The building's window openings, initially composed of one-over-one sash windows, were later replaced by numerous types of window-pane arrangements or by louvers.

==== Base ====
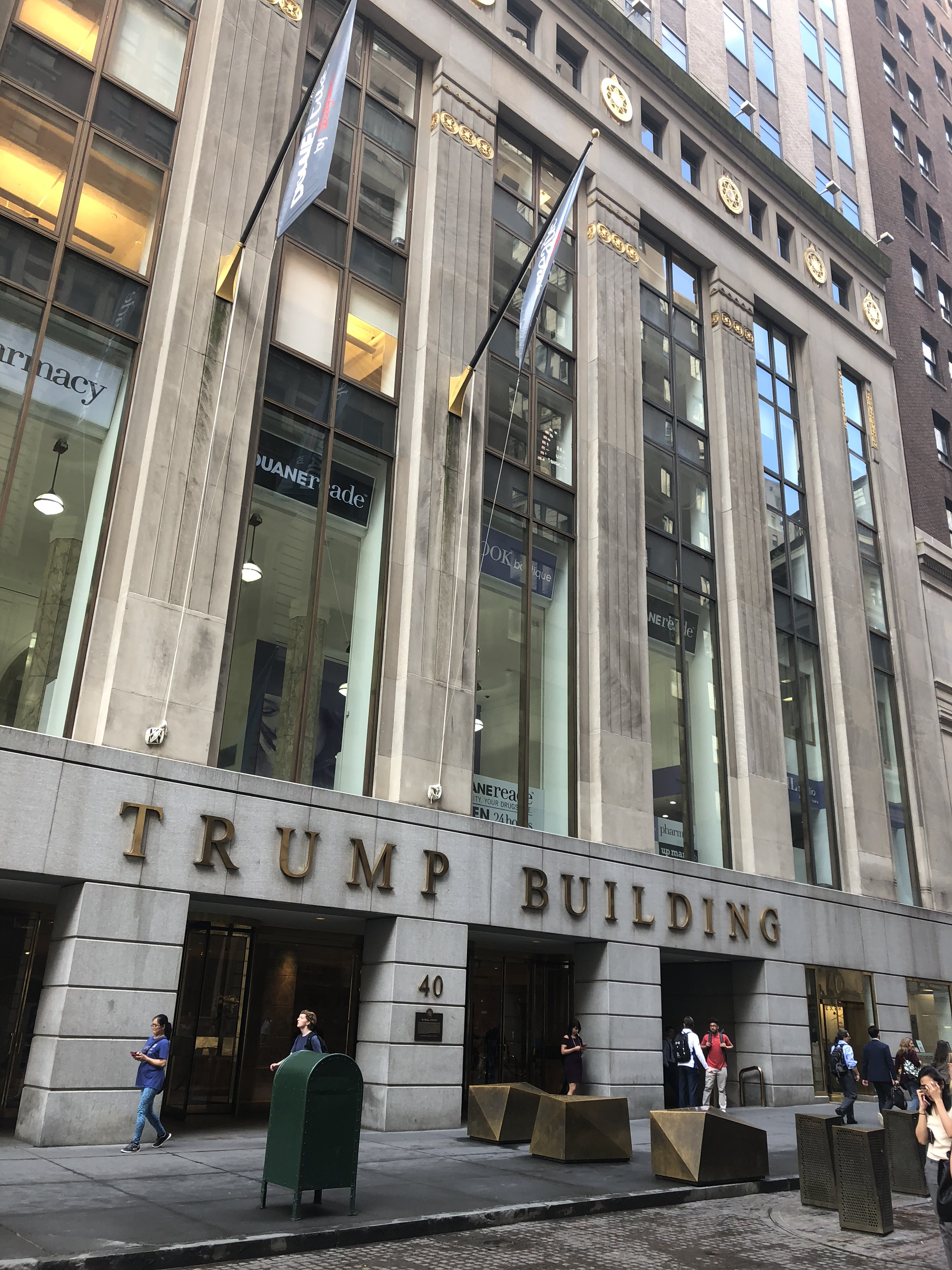
Wall Street facade

The first through sixth stories contain a limestone-and-granite facade. On the first story, the podium on the facade's Wall Street elevation is made of granite. The second- to fifth-floor facades on both sides consist of a colonnade with pilasters made of limestone. The colonnades were intended to resemble those found in Greek temples. During the design of the building, Matsui adjusted the colonnades to match the dimensions of the nearby Subtreasury building (now Federal Hall).

On the Wall Street side, the first floor originally had a central entryway with three bronze-and-glass doors, flanked by numerous entrances to the elevator lobby and the lower banking room. Double-height bronze and glass windows spanned the second and third floors, while cast-iron windows were on the fourth through sixth floors. Above the central entrance was Elie Nadelman's Oceanus sculpture (also called Aquarius); the sculpture was a 10-foot-long (3.0 m) bronze depiction of Oceanus, a Greek Titan pictured on a 19th-century stock certificate issued by the Manhattan Company. The Oceanus sculpture was removed prior to 1973. Between 1961 and 1963, Carson, Lundin & Shaw added granite cladding and reconfigured the doorways on the first floor, and replaced the second- through sixth-floor windows. By 1995, the entrance had been reconfigured with seven bronze rectangular doors and three revolving doors, recessed behind the main facade. Letters reading "The Trump Building" are placed above the first floor, while the fourth floor has a pair of flagpoles.

The Pine Street elevation is arranged similarly to the Wall Street elevation and was likewise redesigned from 1961 to 1963. The Pine Street elevation rises above a low stylobate, in contrast to the Wall Street elevation, which rises above a podium. A 6-foot-diameter (1.8 m) clock was on the Pine Street facade from 1967 to 1993. This portion of the facade consists of either 10 or 11 bays. At ground level, there is an entrance to the main elevator lobby, a service entrance, and storefronts slightly above grade. As with the Wall Street side, the fourth floor features a pair of flagpoles.

==== Upper stories ====
The 8th through 35th stories comprise the midsection of the building. There are eight flagpoles on the ninth floor of the Wall Street side, four on each pavilion. On the 19th floor of the Pine Street side, there are louvers in place of window openings. On the 36th through 62nd stories, there are brick spandrels between the windows on each story. The spandrels on the 52nd through 57th floors are made of terracotta; on the 58th through 60th floors, terracotta with buttresses; and on the 61st and 62nd floors, darker bricks with pediments and rhombus patterns.

The building's pyramidal roof was originally covered with lead-coated copper. Over time the lead has weathered away, exposing the copper which has oxidized and turned blue-green. The roof has French Renaissance-style detail, a design element intended to make the building appear much older than it actually was at the time of its construction. The decorations on the roof include diaperwork patterns, where the brickwork is laid in a repeating diagonal grid pattern; terraces, which are supported by buttresses; and small dormer windows. There is a cornice surrounding the roof. On top is a spire with a flagpole and a glass lantern.

=== Features ===
The building's frame is made of steel. The superstructure contains eight main columns, each of which weighs 22 short tons (20 long tons; 20 t) and can carry loads of up to 4.6 million lb (2.1 million kg). As originally arranged, 40 Wall Street hosted the Manhattan Company's banking facilities on the first through sixth floors; offices on its middle floors; and machinery, an observation deck, and recreation areas on the top floors. There were also 43 elevators inside the building when it opened; as of 2020, there are 36 elevators. When 40 Wall Street was completed, it could accommodate 10,000 employees.

==== Lower stories ====
Like other early-20th-century skyscrapers in the Financial District, the lobby of 40 Wall Street originally was designed with classical elements such as moldings, pilasters, columns, and heavy doorframes. The ground story was highly decentralized with seven entrances from Wall Street, leading to various vestibules. The westernmost entrance led to a private foyer with its own elevator, while the easternmost entrance connected with the elevator banks on the eastern side of the building. Two ground-level banking rooms extended northward to Pine Street: one at the center and one on the west. There was also space for brokerage-house messengers. A wide, marble staircase from the ground level led up to the main banking room on the second floor. The modern design of the lobby dates to a 1990s renovation by Der Scutt. Following Scutt's renovation, the lobby was redecorated with bronze and marble surfaces. The lobby also has escalators to the second floor.

The main banking room, a double-height space measuring 150 by 185 feet (46 by 56 m), was on the second floor. The room could be accessed from ground level or directly from Pine Street. The Pine Street entrance had a foyer with two pairs of octagonal, black marble Ionic columns, while the Wall Street side of the room was supported by veined octagonal columns. The room itself consists of a main hall below five groin vaults, flanked by arcades that lead into smaller vaulted spaces. In the main hall were desks for tellers. To the north and south were two platforms for the officers of the Manhattan Company's subsidiaries, where officers and customers could meet privately in wood-paneled spaces. The walls were once decorated with three murals by Ezra Winter, depicting various scenes from the history of the Financial District; Winter's murals have since been removed. The second floor was occupied by a Duane Reade convenience store from 2011 to 2023.

A pair of stairs on the banking room's south wall flanks the escalators and leads up to what was originally the officers' quarters, a rectangular room with five white marble columns. This space had three doorways that led to private offices of Manhattan Company executives; the doorways to those offices were framed by round carvings symbolizing various sectors of the economy.

Stairs from the ground level led to the two basement stories, where the Manhattan Company's vaults were located. Under the lobby was a main vault that stored the company's own securities and funds. A safe-deposit vault for members of the public, with an 85-short-ton (76-long-ton; 77 t) door, was below the Manhattan Company's vault.

==== Upper stories ====
On the fourth floor was the boardroom of the Manhattan Company, designed in the Georgian style as an imitation of Independence Hall's Signers' Room. It contained several elements of the Doric order, such as columns, pilasters, and a frieze. Wooden doors and fireplaces with segmental arches were on the eastern wall, while false windows were on the western wall. The space also included a fireplace, Chippendale furniture, and a blue rug. According to the Manhattan Company's magazine, the boardroom's design "recaptured the artistic spirit of the days of ... [the company's] founding".

The offices of the Manhattan Company's officers overlooked the Wall Street entrance. The offices were furnished with patterned carpets, soft chairs, and single desks, which were meant to evoke a feeling of luxury. According to Architecture and Building magazine, the executive offices' furnishings were intended as a "pleasingly striking contrast to the modern severity of the usual treatment of financial district structures". The sixth floor housed a trading floor for the International Manhattan Company, Inc. All of the offices on the upper stories were served by a pneumatic tube mail system; according to Matsui, the system was built to accommodate financial tenants "whose functions require rapid transfer of stocks and papers". The pneumatic-tube system delivered mail to and from terminals on the building's mezzanine, precluding the need for messengers to use the elevators or overcrowd the lobby.

The 26th and 27th stories housed the Luncheon Club of Wall Street, a members-only private club, built upon the suggestion of William A. Starrett, the building's general contractor. The Luncheon Club occupied a Colonial-style space designed by Matsui and Robert L. Powell, and included an entrance hall and a main dining room covered in wood, as well as private dining rooms with wallpaper. The 55th floor was entirely occupied by the Manhattan Company's officers' club, which included a dining room. The officers' club was designed in a Colonial style with Windsor chairs, a fireplace, and a ceiling with fake wood beams. Another members-only dining club, the Rookery Club, was located on the 58th story. The Bank of Manhattan Building had an observation deck on the 69th and 70th floors, 836 feet (255 m) above the street; it could fit up to 100 people. The observation deck was closed to the public sometime after World War II.

== History ==
The Manhattan Company was established by Aaron Burr in 1799, ostensibly to provide clean water to Lower Manhattan. The company's true focus was banking, and it served as a competitor to Alexander Hamilton's Bank of New York, which previously held a monopoly over banking in New York City. The Manhattan Company was headquartered at a row house at 40 Wall Street, which was the company's "office of discount and deposit". The bank remained on the site until the present skyscraper was constructed. By the early 20th century, the company was growing quickly, having acquired numerous other banks.

=== Development ===
==== Planning ====
The idea for the current skyscraper was devised by banker George L. Ohrstrom, who began acquiring land for the building in 1928 under the auspices of 36 Wall Street Corporation. Stakeholders in the corporation included Ohrstrom and the builders, Starrett Brothers (later Starrett Corporation). In September 1928, 36 Wall Street Corporation acquired 34–36 Wall Street under a 93-year lease from the Iselin family. At the time, the syndicate hoped to build a 20-story building. By that December, Ohrstrom had purchased four buildings, with frontage along 27–33 Pine Street and 34–38 Wall Street, and controlled a total area of 17,000 square feet (1,600 m^{2}). The plans had been updated, and the syndicate at that point envisioned a 45-story building. In January 1929, the corporation planned a bond issue to fund the building's construction. That March, Ohrstrom announced that H. Craig Severance would design a 47-story structure at 36 Wall Street. The corporation bought 25 Pine Street the same month.

Shortly after Severance's original plans were announced, the skyscraper was modified to have 60 floors, which was shorter than the 792-foot (241 m) Woolworth Building and the then under construction 808-foot (246 m) Chrysler Building. Plans for a 64-story skyscraper were announced after the Manhattan Company agreed to relocate to the new building in early April 1929. By April 8, Ohrstrom and Severance had planned to make the new skyscraper the world's tallest building. Two days later, it was announced that Severance had increased the tower's height to 840 feet (260 m) with 62 floors, exceeding the heights of the Woolworth and Chrysler buildings. It was also announced that the Manhattan Company would be 36 Wall Street's main tenant and that the new building would be known as the Bank of Manhattan Building or the Manhattan Company Building. The height of the building was made possible by the 33,600-square-foot (3,120 m^{2}) lot, which was one of the largest in the densely-developed Financial District.

The builders intended to spend large sums to reduce the construction period to one year, which would allow rental tenants to move into the building sooner. By mid-April 1929, tenants of the existing buildings on the lot had moved elsewhere. The Manhattan Company and Chrysler buildings started competing for the distinction of "world's tallest building". The "Race into the Sky", as popular media called it at the time, was representative of the country's optimism in the 1920s, fueled by the building boom in major cities. The Manhattan Company Building was revised to 927 feet (283 m) in April 1929, which would make it the world's tallest. Severance then publicly claimed the title of the world's tallest building, (Note: This distinction excludes structures that were not fully habitable, such as the Eiffel Tower.) but the Starrett Corporation denied any allegations that the plans had been changed to beat the Chrysler Building.

==== Start of construction ====
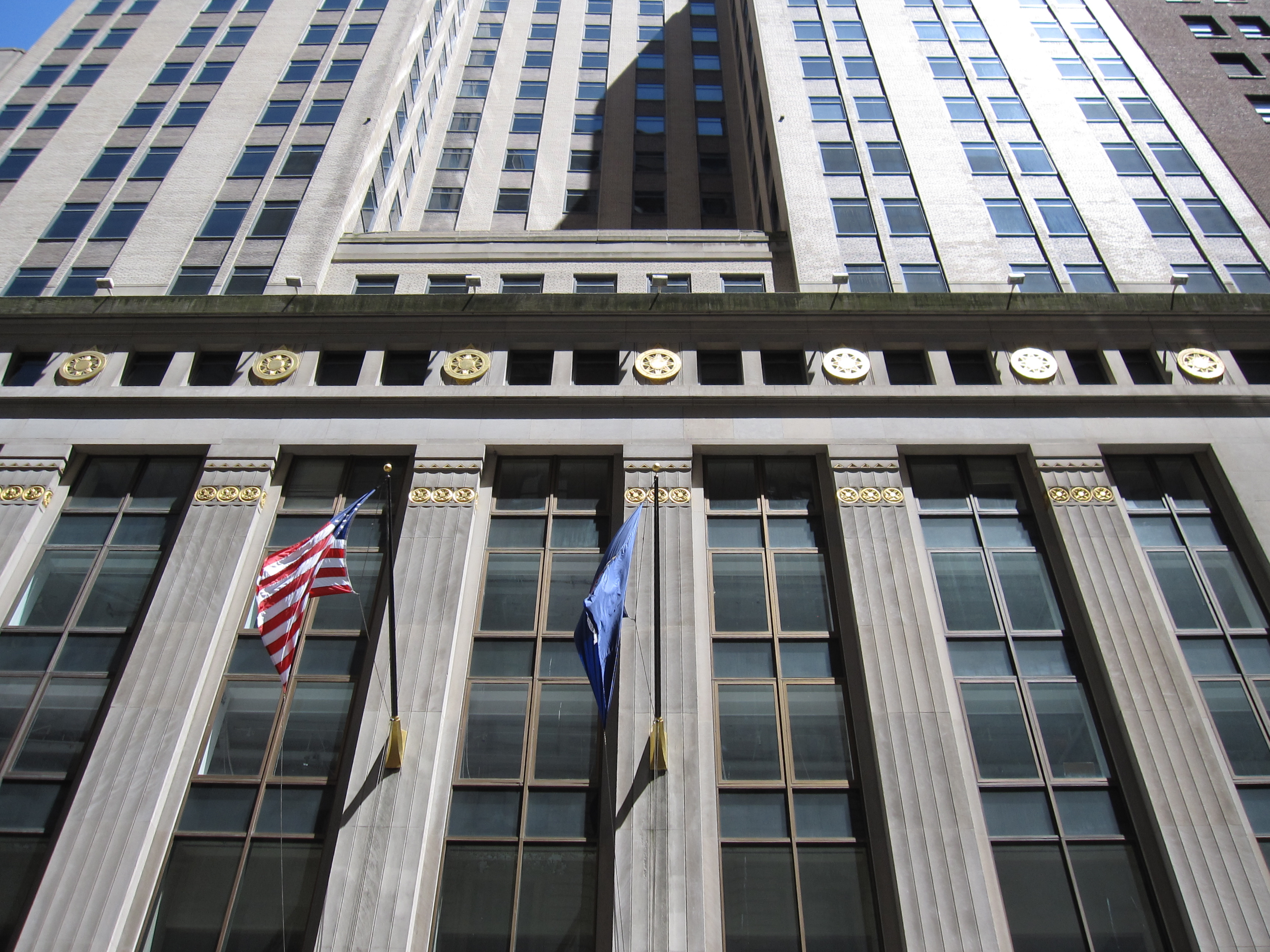
View of the lower stories

Construction of the Manhattan Company Building began in May 1929. By that time, the syndicate developing the building was known as the 40 Wall Street Corporation, and the building was also known as 40 Wall Street. That same month, the Manhattan Company leased its lots at 40–42 Wall Street and 35–39 Pine Street to the 40 Wall Street Corporation for 93 years. Ownership would be divided among the Manhattan Company, the Iselin family, and the 40 Wall Street Corporation, with the Manhattan Company holding a plurality stake. Simultaneously, the U.S. government invited bids on the adjoining building at 28–30 Wall Street, then occupied by a federal assay office. In June 1929, the government announced that the 40 Wall Street Corporation had placed the highest bid for the lot, bringing the syndicate's total land holding to 40,000 square feet (3,700 m^{2}). The assay office plot was reserved for future expansion, instead of being incorporated into the plans for the new skyscraper. The Manhattan Company moved to a temporary headquarters during construction.

Excavations for 40 Wall Street were complicated by numerous factors. There was little available space to store materials; the surrounding lots were all densely built up; the bedrock was 64 feet (20 m) below street level, beneath boulders and quicksand; and the previous buildings on the lot had foundations up to 5 feet (1.5 m) thick. Furthermore, the builders had a 12-month deadline, requiring them to plan the entire project backward from the planned completion date. Starrett Brothers had drawn up a detailed construction schedule for 40 Wall Street, outlining the timeline for each major construction contract. The schedule indicated that structural-steel installation would commence in June 1929 and that all work was to be completed by May 1, 1930. The project employed 24 timekeepers and auditors, who checked employees' attendance, as well as seven job runners, who delivered architectural drawings and ensured that materials were delivered.

To save money and time, the foundation of 40 Wall Street was constructed at the same time that buildings on the site were being cleared. The old Manhattan Company building was the last to be cleared. Caisson construction could not be used to excavate the site since the existing foundation consisted of heavy masonry blocks. To ensure that the foundation could adequately support the structure, temporary lighter footings were installed during the demolition of the old buildings and construction of the first 20 stories, and permanent heavy footings were installed afterward. Workers excavated the site to the underlying layer of bedrock, which extended as much as 60 feet (18 m) deep. They then installed several dozen hollow cylinders, each measuring 1 foot (0.30 m) wide. In addition, workers installed several hundred steel pilings, which were clustered into piers, infilled with concrete, and topped by steel caps that could accommodate structural loads of up to 950 short tons (850 long tons; 860 t). The weight of the existing 12-story building on the site was used to drill the new building's foundations into the ground. Afterward, a concrete floor was poured into the excavation, which was then enclosed with a concrete cofferdam.

==== Superstructure and completion ====
In July 1929, the builders held a ceremony where William A. Starrett, head of the Starrett Corporation, drove the first rivet into the building's frame. Starrett received a $5 million loan that same month to finance the building. Work on 40 Wall Street progressed quickly, and the contractors completed four stories each week. The site was active 24 hours a day, with 2,300 workers working in three shifts; interior furnishing progressed as the steel frame rose. Workers used passenger elevators to transport materials, obviating the need for temporary construction cranes. Matsui described the steel frame as a "web system of rigidity", with joints and diagonal beams providing both lateral bracing and wind bracing. The steel frame for 40 Wall Street was manufactured in Bethlehem, Pennsylvania; transported to Jersey City, New Jersey, using 800 railcars; shipped across the Hudson River via barge; and transported from the dock to the construction site via truck. Derricks then lifted the steel beams into place, where groups of four workers riveted them onto the frame. As the tower rose, the derricks were themselves lifted two stories at a time.

Workers then installed the tower's facade by hanging pieces of curtain wall from the completed steel frame. Interior work proceeded simultaneously with the facade installation. The steel superstructure reached the 40th story by September 1929, when interior plasterwork began. The building topped out on November 13, 1929. By that time, the steel frame had reached 900 feet (270 m) above street level, the facade had been completed to the 54th story, and much of the internal furnishing had been completed. By December, rental agents Brown, Wheelock, Harris, Vought & Company were leasing out the space at the Chrysler and Manhattan Company buildings, which aggregated 2 million ft^{2} (190,000 m^{2}).

The 40 Wall Street Corporation gave a $12.5 million mortgage for the building's completion in December 1929, and the corporation planned a bond issue of an equivalent value by January 1930. The building's roof was covered with scaffolding by March 1930, although Manhattan Company officials denied that they were trying to increase the building's height. The work was completed on May 1, 1930. Several workers received craftsmanship awards in a ceremony at the end of April 1930. The building officially opened on May 26. In total, $24 million had been spent on construction. Four workers died while constructing 40 Wall Street; a similar mortality rate to other contemporary projects of similar scale. Paul Starrett, of the Starrett Corporation, said: "Of all the construction work which I have handled, the Bank of Manhattan was the most complicated and the most difficult, and I regard it as the most successful."

=== Early years ===
==== Competition for "world's tallest building" title ====
40 Wall Street was the world's tallest completed building for one month.

Prior to 40 Wall Street's completion, architect William Van Alen obtained permission to install a 125-foot (38 m) long spire on the Chrysler Building and had it constructed secretly. The Chrysler Building's spire was completed on October 23, 1929, bringing that building to 1,046 feet (319 m), thereby greatly exceeding 40 Wall Street's height. Disturbed by Chrysler's victory, Shreve & Lamb wrote a newspaper article claiming that their building was the tallest, since it contained the world's highest usable floor. They stated that the observation deck at 40 Wall Street was nearly 100 feet (30 m) above the top floor in the Chrysler Building. 40 Wall Street's observation deck was 836 feet (255 m) high, while the Chrysler Building's observatory was 783 feet (239 m) high. As a result of the Chrysler Building's spire, 40 Wall Street was the tallest building in Lower Manhattan but not the tallest in New York City.

John J. Raskob, developer of the Empire State Building (which was also designed by Shreve & Lamb), also wanted to construct the world's tallest building. The "Race into the Sky" was defined by at least five other proposals, although only the Empire State Building would survive the Wall Street Crash of 1929. (Note: These proposals included the 100-story Metropolitan Life North Building; a 1,050-foot (320 m) tower built by Abraham E. Lefcourt at Broadway and 49th Street; a 100-story tower developed by the Fred F. French Company on Sixth Avenue between 43rd and 44th streets; an 85-story tower to be developed on the site of the Belmont Hotel near Grand Central Terminal; and the Noyes-Schulte Company's proposed tower on Broadway between Duane and Worth streets. Only one of these projects was even partially completed: the base of the Metropolitan Life North Building.) Plans for the Empire State Building were changed multiple times; the final plan, published in December 1929, called for the building to be 1,250 feet (380 m) tall. The Empire State Building was completed in May 1931, becoming the world's tallest building both by roof height and spire height.

Because of late changes to the plans of both 40 Wall Street and the Chrysler Building, as well as the fact that the buildings were erected nearly simultaneously, it is uncertain whether 40 Wall Street was ever taller than the Chrysler Building. John Tauranac, who wrote a book about the Empire State Building's history, later stated that if 40 Wall Street had "ever had been the tallest building, they would have had bragging rights, and if they did, I certainly never heard them". If only completed structures are counted, 40 Wall Street was the world's tallest building for one month, from the first week of May 1930 until the opening of the Chrysler Building on May 27, 1930.

==== Early tenants and foreclosure ====
The new building housed four Manhattan Company subsidiaries: the Bank of Manhattan Trust Company, the International Acceptance Bank, the International Manhattan Company, and the Bank of Manhattan Safe Deposit Company. The Manhattan Company used the two basement levels for storage vaults; the 1st through 6th stories for bank operations; and the 55th floor for its officers' club. Merrill was one of the first tenants, renting the 54th floor in April 1930. A private lunch club called the Wall Street Club became a tenant in March 1931. 40 Wall Street opened following the Wall Street Crash of 1929, and so suffered from a lack of tenants. Many of the original tenants had withdrawn their commitments to rent space in the building and, in some cases, had gone bankrupt. As a result, only half of the space in 40 Wall Street was leased during the 1930s. Office space rented for $3 per square foot ($32/m^{2}), less than half of the $8 per square foot ($86/m^{2}) that the building's owners had sought. For the first five years of the building's existence, 40 Wall Street Corporation was able to pay the $323,200 interest on the second mortgage-bond issue.

By early 1939, 40 Wall Street Corporation had fallen behind on rent payments, ground leases, and property taxes. That May, the Marine Midland Trust Company started foreclosure proceedings against the corporation after it defaulted on "payments of interest, taxes and other charges". In response, several bondholders formed a committee to protect their stakes; the committee expressed opposition to the proposed reorganization. In July 1939, the corporation filed a plan to reorganize all assets that were not covered by the mortgage loans. Marine Midland became the trustee of 40 Wall Street's first-mortgage fee and its bonds on the lease in February 1940, supplanting the corporation. Marine Midland, acting on behalf of the bondholders, acquired the building that September in a transaction worth almost $11.5 million. The New York Times later described the building as being "a monument to lost hope" during that era: at the time, the building's $1,000 debentures were being sold at $108.75 apiece. The structure as a whole was worth $1.25 million, which was less than the cost of the 43 elevators inside the building.

C. F. Noyes was hired as the building's leasing agent at the end of 1940. One of the larger tenants during the 1940s was the Westinghouse Electric and Manufacturing Company, which in 1941 leased four floors. Other tenants included real-estate agents, lawyers, brokers, and bankers, as well as a short-film theater in 1941. More tenants came during World War II, starting with the United States Department of the Navy. The building was 80% leased by 1943 and was 90% leased the following year. After the United States Department of War leased four floors in July 1944, the building reached full occupancy for the first time in its history. Many large tenants such as Prudential Financial, Westinghouse, and Western Union signed long-term leases. After several tenants left during the late 1940s, the building was completely rented again in 1951. At the time, 40 Wall Street's office space was renting for $4.22 per square foot ($45.4/m^{2}), a relatively high price for a building constructed before air conditioning became popular.

==== 1946 plane crash ====
On the evening of May 20, 1946, a Beechcraft C-45F Expediter airplane belonging to the United States Army Air Forces crashed into 40 Wall Street's northern facade. The twin-engine plane was heading for Newark Airport on a flight originating at Lake Charles Army Air Field in Louisiana. It struck the 58th floor of the building at about 8:10 pm, creating a 20-by-10-foot (6.1 m × 3.0 m) hole in the masonry. The crash killed all five aboard the plane, including a Women's Army Corps officer, though no one in the building or on the ground was hurt. The fuselage and the wing of the splintered plane fell onto the 12th-story setback, while parts of the aircraft and pieces of brick and mortar from the building fell into the street below. Fog and low visibility were identified as the main causes of the crash, since LaGuardia Field had reported a heavy fog that reduced the ceiling to 500 feet (150 m), obscuring the view of the ground for the pilot at the building's 58th story.

The month after the plane crash, the owners of 40 Wall Street filed a building application with the Department of Buildings to fix the hole in the facade. This crash was the second in New York City in less than a year; an Army B-25 bomber having struck the 78th floor of the Empire State Building in July 1945, also caused by fog and poor visibility. The incident prompted the Army, in June 1946, to ban planes from landing in New York City during heavy fog. It was the last time a plane crashed into a building in New York City in the 20th century.

=== 1950s to 1970s ===
==== Chase relocation and Webb & Knapp acquisition ====
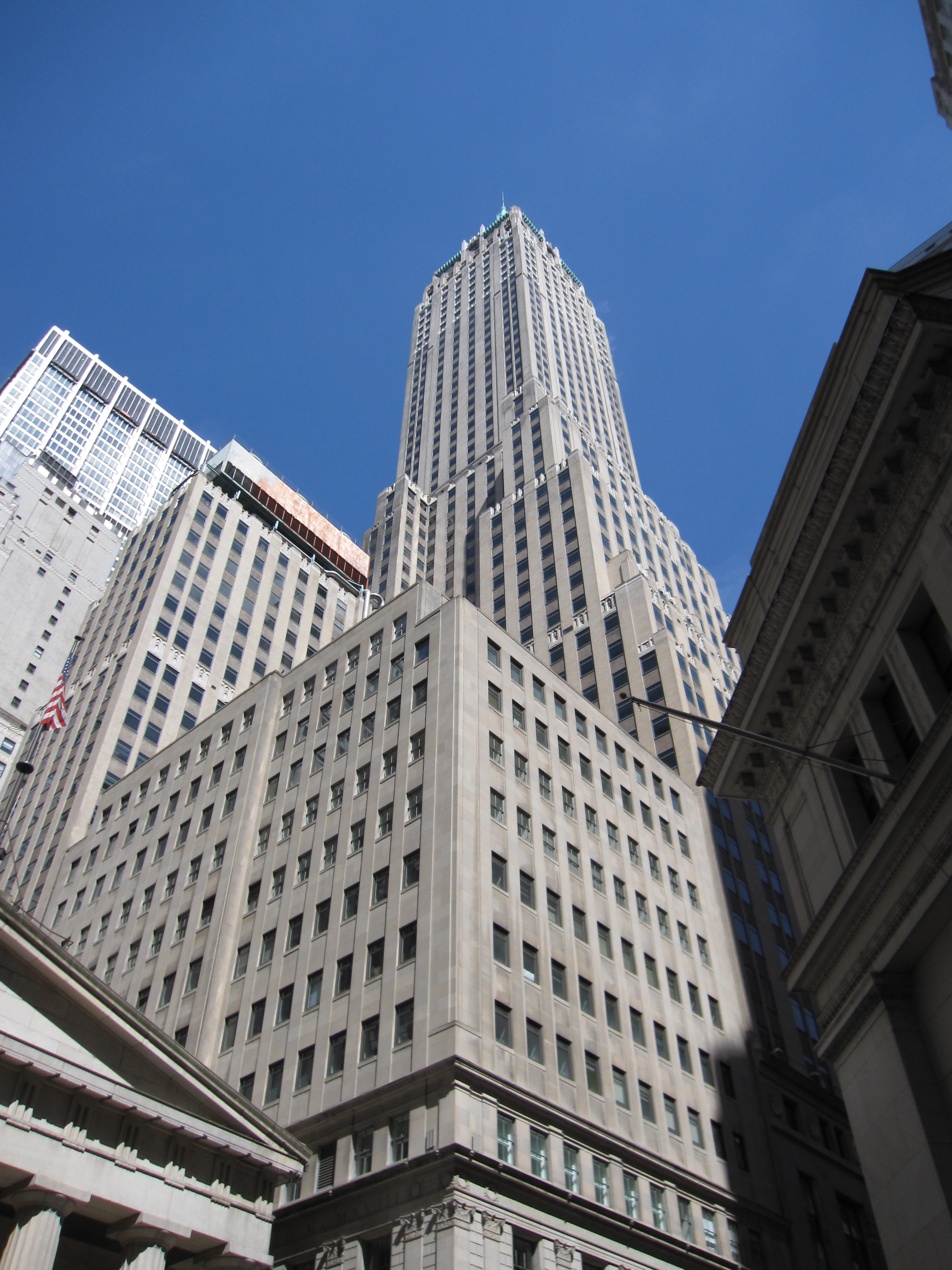
The building as seen from street level. 23 Wall Street is to the right, Federal Hall National Memorial is to the left, and 30 Wall Street is in the foreground.

In August 1950, the building's owners submitted plans for an alteration of the building at a cost of $300,000. Over the following years, the building was retrofitted with air conditioning. The directors of the Manhattan Company and Chase National Bank voted in January 1955 to merge their respective companies, and Chase Manhattan Bank was created as a result of the merger. The new company was headquartered at Chase National's previous building at 20 Pine Street, immediately north of 40 Wall Street; soon afterward, Chase constructed a building at the neighboring 28 Liberty Street to serve as its headquarters. Meanwhile, several offices as well as a bank branch remained in 40 Wall Street.

By 1956, the building's financial situation had improved considerably, and 40 Wall Street Corporation's $1,000 debentures were selling for $1,550. That year, real estate developer William Zeckendorf had his company Webb and Knapp buy the leaseholds for the land from 40 Wall Street Inc., Chase, and the estate of the Iselin family. Webb and Knapp also bought 32 percent of 40 Wall Street Corporation's stock, eventually increasing their stake to two-thirds of the corporation's shares. The firm attempted to sell 40 Wall Street in October 1957 for $15 million, but a New York Supreme Court justice enjoined the sale in November 1957 after several minority shareholders claimed the sale was illegal.

The corporation's stockholders voted in June 1959 to sell the building for no less than $17 million. To reduce disagreements, a State Supreme Court justice ordered that an auction be held for the building. That October, stockholders held an auction for 40 Wall Street. Zeckendorf submitted the highest bid, at $18.15 million, although there was only one other bidder. At the time, 40 Wall Street was believed to be the most valuable real-estate property ever to be auctioned in New York City. Webb & Knapp had spent $32 million to acquire the building; excluding the auction, the remainder of the cost was used to pay Chase and the Iselin estate.

==== City & Central and Loeb, Rhoades operation ====
Webb and Knapp sold the property to the Metropolitan Life Insurance Company in April 1960 for $20 million. Metropolitan Life leased the building back to Webb and Knapp for 99 years, under a leasehold that cost $1.2 million a year. Chase Manhattan was relocating to its new headquarters at 28 Liberty Street, and the Manufacturers Hanover Corporation was planning to relocate to the second through fifth floors, which Chase Manhattan was vacating. That September, Webb and Knapp sold the leasehold to British investors City & Central Investments (later City Centre Properties) for $15 million. The sale was finalized in November 1960, and City & Central acquired title that following month. The new operator renovated the interior and exterior. Manufacturers Hanover moved to the building in 1962, relocating $24 billion in deposits to 40 Wall Street from its old headquarters at 70 Broadway.

City Centre sold the leasehold to Loeb, Rhoades & Co., 40 Wall Street's largest tenant, in June 1966. Other major tenants at the time included Bache & Co., which had rented 180,000 square feet (17,000 m^{2}) by 1966. Manufacturers Hanover relocated many of its offices to 600 Fifth Avenue and 55 Water Street. After Loeb, Rhoades & Co. merged with Shearson in 1980, the 251,000 square feet (23,300 m^{2}) of office space occupied by Loeb, Rhoades & Co. was vacated; the space was quickly leased to Morgan Guaranty and Toronto-Dominion Bank. At the time, 40 Wall Street had 875 square feet (81.3 m^{2}) that was not yet rented, and office space in the Financial District was typically rented for $16 to $20 per square foot ($170 to $220/m^{2}).

=== 1980s and early 1990s ===
In 1982, the property was purchased by a German investment group headed by Walter Hinneberg. Hinneberg and two of his siblings transferred their 80 percent ownership stake to an entity named 40 Wall Street Holdings Corporation in 1992. The other two owners conveyed their combined 20 percent stake to an entity named New Scandic Wall Ltd.

==== Marcos family leasehold ====
At the end of 1982, Loeb, Rhoades & Co. sold the leasehold to a holding company; the Philippine dictator Ferdinand Marcos and his wife Imelda would be revealed as the real buyers in 1985. According to a broker who was involved in the sale, the Marcos family's agents, brothers Joseph J. and Ralph E. Bernstein, were initially believed to be buying the building for the wealthy Gaon family of Switzerland, as Joseph Bernstein's wife was a member of that family. (Note: Marcos was also found to have purchased several other New York City buildings; see Overseas landholdings of the Marcos family.) The operators planned to gild 40 Wall Street's roof. In coded cables between the Marcos family and their alleged "front" in Manhattan, Gliceria Tantoco, the 40 Wall Street building was referred to using the secret code-word "Bridgetown". By February 1986, 40 Wall Street's leasehold, and three other buildings reportedly owned by the Marcoses, were placed for sale. Around that time, the Bernsteins were contemplating paying $250 million for 40 Wall Street and two of the other buildings.

After Marcos was forced out of office, the administration of his successor Corazon Aquino froze Marcos's assets within U.S. banking channels in March 1986, and the building's future became uncertain. Citicorp, which had placed a mortgage on the building, indicated in December 1986 that it would foreclose on the property. After the U.S. Court of Appeals for the Second Circuit ruled to block the sale of the Marcos properties that November, the Aquino administration filed a lawsuit against the Marcos estate to obtain title to the buildings. The Bernsteins alleged that they paid $235 million for 40 Wall Street, Herald Center, and the Crown Building, but the Philippine government claimed that the sale was never finalized. The Saudi arms dealer Adnan Khashoggi also claimed to be involved with the building's purchase; he asserted that he had owned the building for several years before the Bernsteins' alleged purchase. Khashoggi was subsequently accused of helping the Marcoses hide their stakes in their buildings, although he was acquitted of all racketeering charges in relation to the properties.

Capital improvements to the building, including upgrades to its unreliable elevators, were suspended while legal proceedings were ongoing. The Aquino administration attempted in early 1989 to sell the four Marcos properties to Morris Bailey for $398 million. Federal district court judge Pierre N. Leval ordered a foreclosure sale of the Marcos properties in August 1989; the Bailey group hoped that Citigroup would name them as the preferred bidders. At the court-ordered auction, the Bernsteins submitted the winning bid of $108.6 million after another bidder, Jack Resnick & Sons, refused to raise its bid of $108.55 million. The second mortgage with Citicorp comprised $60 million of this total. The Bernstein brothers paid the $1.5 million down payment, but they could not pay the remainder of the purchase price before the October 10, 1989, deadline. At the time, the Bernsteins were also involved in a bankruptcy proceeding in Curaçao; a special master there had refused to repeal a bankruptcy action that would have allowed the Bernsteins to pay the remainder of 40 Wall Street's purchase price. This prompted a second auction of the building's leasehold.

==== Resnick operation and further issues ====
At a second auction in November 1989, Burton Resnick of Jack Resnick & Sons paid $77,000,100 for the leasehold, beating Citicorp's bid by $100. By then, demand for real estate in Lower Manhattan had declined in the aftermath of Black Monday in 1987. Resnick's lawyer, Howard J. Rubenstein, said his client planned to spend $30 million to $40 million renovating 40 Wall Street, although real-estate experts said the building needed closer to $50 million in renovations. Resnick decided in 1990 to spend $50 million on upgrades. The renovation would have included fire, electrical, and mechanical system replacement; renovation of the lobby; restoration of the facade and windows; and replacement of the elevators. The Resnicks were only able to upgrade the windows; they defaulted on their mortgage in 1991, and Citicorp took over the leasehold. Citicorp canceled financing for the renovation that year, citing concerns that tenants, including Manufacturers Hanover, which had moved from the lower stories of the building in 1982, might move out.

By the early 1990s, 40 Wall Street was 80 percent vacant. The building's maintenance had declined to the point that tenants reported that they frequently waited 20 minutes for an elevator, and many interior spaces had been stripped to the steel frame. Homeless people were squatting in vacant floors because the building had limited security. The building was also seen as outdated, since it had no freight elevator, the upper stories were too small, and the office floors had large numbers of structural columns. In 1992, Citicorp prepared to sell 40 Wall Street again; the asking price was reportedly as low as $10 million. The building's valuation had declined from $123 million in 1990 to $75 million in 1993. If 40 Wall Street's lease were not sold and renovated before the end of 1992, the owners were entitled to exercise a clause to evict the leaseholder.

American International Group attempted to acquire Citicorp's stake in the building for $6.5 million, but the negotiations failed in November 1992, in what Crain's New York magazine described as a "collapse of downtown real estate". Citicorp auctioned off the building in May 1993; the bank wrote down the building's value to zero. Hong Kong firm Glorious Sun considered buying the building but ultimately decided against it. Another group from Hong Kong, the consortium Kinson Properties, agreed to lease the property, paying $8 million. Kinson planned to renovate the building for $60 million, including the lobby for $4 million and electrical and mechanical systems for $5–7 million. By the time Kinson sold the leasehold in 1995, little had been done to improve the property.

=== Trump lease ===
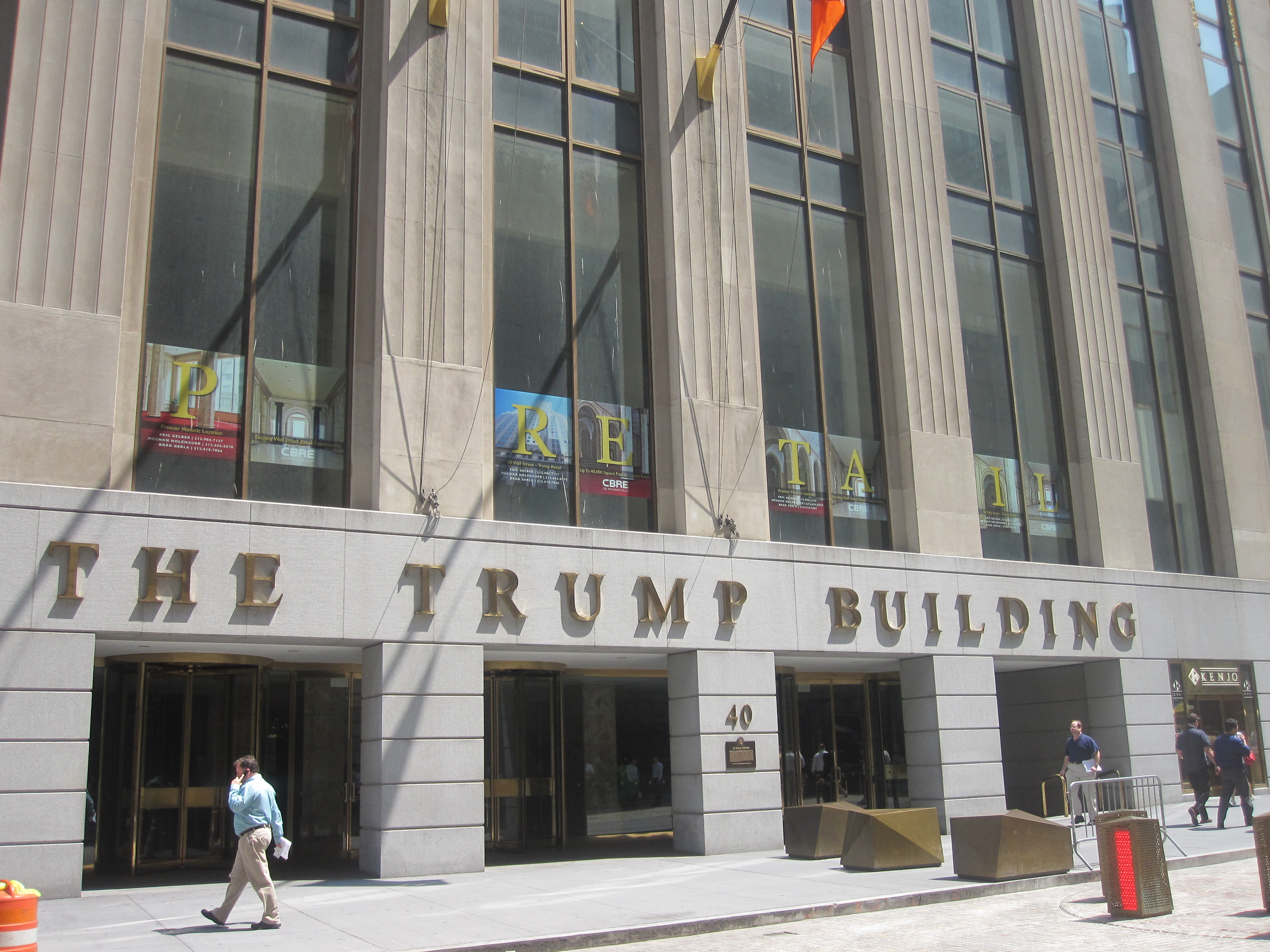
Seen from ground level at Wall Street

In July 1995, real estate developer Donald Trump signed a letter of intent to buy Kinson's lease and spend $100 million on renovations. The leasehold was transferred that December. There have been conflicting accounts about the price of the leasehold. The New York Times reported that Trump purchased the leasehold for $8 million, while Barron's cited the leasehold as having cost between $3 million and $5 million. In November 1995, Trump stated that he was buying the leasehold from Kinson for $100,000. During a 2005 episode of The Apprentice, Trump claimed he only paid $1 million for the leasehold but that the property was actually worth $400 million. Trump's legal advisor, George H. Ross, restated this claim in a 2005 book. On a 2007 episode of CNBC's The Billionaire Inside, Trump again claimed that he paid $1 million for the leasehold but stated the building's value as $600 million. In 2012, it was reported that Trump paid $10 million for the leasehold.

Estimates of the building's worth also varied. City tax assessors had valued the building at $90 million by 2000 and reported that the building was worth the same amount in 2004. While Trump estimated the building's worth at $1 billion in 2012, an external appraisal the same year valued the building at $220 million. Trump maintained in 2013 that the building was worth $530 million. Trump's lenders estimated that the building was worth $540 million in 2015 (though the Trump Organization gave a higher figure of $735 million), and Bloomberg News estimated the next year that 40 Wall Street was worth $550 million.

==== 1990s to 2010s ====
Trump spent $35 million refurbishing 40 Wall Street. Der Scutt Architects renovated the lobby, and the Trump Organization replaced several hundred windows, refurbished 30 elevator cabs, and added lights to illuminate the roof. He planned to convert the upper half of 40 Wall Street to residential space, leaving the bottom half as commercial space. The plan was contingent on the passage of a state law in late 1995, which granted tax exemptions to developers who renovated office buildings in New York into residential and commercial space. Trump had planned to rent out some space as studio apartments and one- to three-bedroom apartments, but real-estate experts, quoted in the New York Daily News, said the lowest 25 floors were so large that it would not be profitable to convert them to apartments. By 1997, Trump was negotiating with hotel chains to occupy the lower stories of 40 Wall Street. Among these chains was Marriott International, which proposed operating a Ritz-Carlton hotel on either ten or twelve stories. At the time, the building was about 25 percent occupied.

Trump canceled his plans to convert the upper floors to residential space, citing high costs. By 1998, almost all of the space in the building had been leased. Several large tenants, such as American Express, CNA Financial Corporation, Bear Stearns, Nomura Holdings, Country-Wide Insurance Company, Hilton Hotels & Resorts, and Union Bank of California, had moved into 40 Wall Street after its renovation. The same year, Trump obtained a $125 million mortgage loan for the building from several European banks. Trump tried to sell the building in 2004, expecting offers in excess of $400 million, which did not materialize. The New York Times wrote in 2005 that the building had $145 million of debt. At the time, the building was earning $32 million in rental income a year, and 40 Wall Street was still about 90 percent occupied; many tenants' leases were not scheduled to expire for several years.

In early July 2011, Duane Reade opened its flagship drugstore branch inside the former banking space. 40 Wall Street Ltd. transferred its ownership stake in the building to 40 Wall Street Holdings in 2014. According to Federal Election Commission applications filed during Trump's 2016 U.S. presidential campaign, Trump had an outstanding mortgage of over $50 million on the property. At the time, Trump leased the building for $1.65 million a year, and the Trump Organization paid $1 million annually in expenses and fees. According to Bloomberg News, several of the building's 21st-century tenants had been accused of fraudulent activity or had been associated with people accused of such activities. Rental income from 40 Wall Street's commercial spaces increased from $30.5 million in 2014 to $43.2 million in 2018. Forbes estimated in 2020 that Trump owed Ladder Capital $138 million for 40 Wall Street as part of a loan that was scheduled to mature in 2025.

==== 2020s to present ====
New York prosecutors had scrutinized several of the Trump Organization's properties by 2021, at the end of the first presidency of Donald Trump. They found that, between 2011 and 2015, far higher values were presented to potential lenders than were reported to tax officials. The most extreme case involved 40 Wall Street, which in 2012 was cited as being worth $527 million to lenders but only $16.7 million to tax officials. By February 2023, the building had been placed on a lender watchlist because of its rising vacancy rate, which had reached 18 percent in late 2022, and its maintenance costs, which had risen 11 percent since the mortgage was issued in 2015. Fitch Ratings downgraded the credit rating for the building's loans in August 2023 because new tenants were slow to move into the building while old tenants relocated elsewhere. The building's Duane Reade location closed later that year due to shoplifting, and the loan on the property was transferred to a special servicer that November due to the state government's ongoing civil investigation of the Trump Organization. Following a January 2024 ruling in which the Trump Organization was found liable for civil fraud, New York Attorney General Letitia James said her office was prepared to seize the building if the organization could not repay a $355 million judgment.

By that April, the building's vacancy rate had increased to 21%, and the building's mortgage loan was scheduled to come due in 2025. The building had become a tourist attraction, and The Washington Post wrote that Trump's detractors sometimes came to the building to express their animosity. A reporter for Curbed wrote in late 2024 that 40 Wall Street was so controversial, even in the real estate industry, that few people in that industry were willing to publicly discuss the building's finances. At the time, the retail space and several floors were vacant. The building's credit rating was downgraded further in March 2025, and the Trump Organization paid off the $114 million balance on its loan from Ladder Capital that June. By the next month, one-fourth of the building had been vacant for a year, and the property's annual income was $2 million less than its mortgage payments. An Italian food hall, Nerolab, also opened in the building in mid-2025.

== Impact ==
In February 1930, the Down Town League proclaimed 40 Wall Street the best building completed in Lower Manhattan during the preceding year. Fortune magazine praised Ohrstrom in 1930, noting that "[h]is piece de resistance thus far has been the shrewd and able financing of the Manhattan Company Building". Two years later, W. Parker Chase wrote that "no building ever constructed more thoroughly typifies the American spirit of hustle than does this extraordinary structure". When the neighboring 28 Liberty Street was being built in 1960, Architectural Forum wrote of 40 Wall Street: "Viewed from the street, the detailing of the top of this middle-aged tower becomes insignificant, but it can be said that the draftsmen in the Severance office, who spent many painstaking hours perfecting the ornamental peak more than three decades ago, have been justified at last."

Architecture critic Robert A. M. Stern wrote in his 1987 book New York 1930 that 40 Wall Street's proximity to other skyscrapers, including 70 Pine Street, 1 Wall Street, 20 Exchange Place, and the Downtown Athletic Club, had reduced older skyscrapers "to the status of foothills in a new mountain range". Eric Nash wrote in his book Manhattan Skyscrapers that 40 Wall Street's impact was blunted by its location in the middle of the block, "surrealistically situated next to the mighty Greek Revival Federal Hall National Memorial". A critic for Newsday wrote in 2003: "It appears on few postcards, and no tourists queue to peer from its celestial ramparts. The AIA Guide to New York City does not even mention the singular ambition, pursued with almost reckless abandon, that forged its construction: to be the world's tallest building."

On December 12, 1995, the New York City Landmarks Preservation Commission designated 40 Wall Street as a city landmark, noting that the Bank of Manhattan Building was historically significant for being the headquarters of the Manhattan Company and for being part of New York City's 1929–1930 skyscraper race. Five years later, on June 16, 2000, it was added to the National Register of Historic Places, largely for the same reason as the city designation. In 2007, the building was designated as a contributing property to the Wall Street Historic District, a NRHP district.

== See also ==
- List of tallest buildings in New York City
- List of tallest freestanding steel structures
- List of New York City Designated Landmarks in Manhattan below 14th Street
- National Register of Historic Places listings in Manhattan below 14th Street
- Overseas landholdings of the Marcos family

Records
Preceded by Woolworth Building	Tallest building in the world 1929–1930	Succeeded by Chrysler Building
Preceded by Woolworth Building	Tallest building in the United States; 1929–1930	Succeeded by Chrysler Building
