= Walter J. Hinneberg =

German shipbroker (born 1919)

Walter Jurgen Hinneberg (born 30 January 1919, date of death unknown) was a German shipbroker and real estate investor from Hamburg, Germany. In 1958, he founded the Walter J. Hinneberg GmbH in Hamburg.

== Life and career ==
Hinneberg was born in Hamburg, Germany on 30 January 1919. In 1982, his daughter Anita, his sons, the twins Walter and Christian Hinneberg (born 1953), together with two German business partners, bought the property and the high-rise 40 Wall Street in New York City from the previous owner, the insurer Metropolitan Life Insurance. Hinneberg is deceased.
