= James Gallatin =

American Banker (1796-1876)

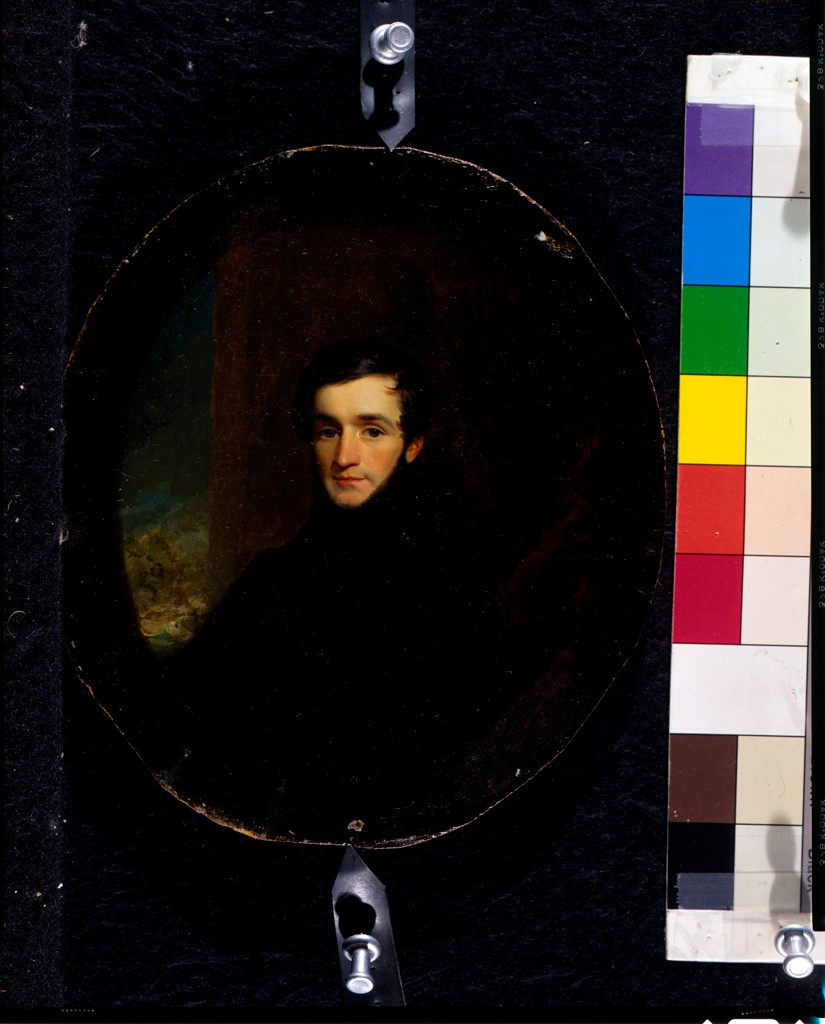
Portrait of Gallatin by George Linen, 1837, Fogg Art Museum

James Gallatin (December 18, 1796 – May 29, 1876) was an American banker who was the son of Albert Gallatin.

== Early life ==
He was the eldest of two sons and four daughters born to Hannah (née Nicholson) Gallatin and Albert Gallatin, the 4th U.S. Secretary of the Treasury who served as the U.S. Ambassador to the United Kingdom and France. His siblings were Catherine, Sophia, Hannah Marie, Frances, and Albert Rolaz Gallatin. Catherine, Sophia and Hannah Marie died as infants while his sister Frances married Byam Kerby Stevens (a son of Gen. Ebenezer Stevens) and his brother Albert Rolaz married Mary Lucille Stevens (a granddaughter of Gen. Stevens).

His father was born to a wealthy family in Geneva, Switzerland, the son of Jean Gallatin and his wife Sophie Albertine Rollaz. His maternal grandparents were Frances Witter Nicholson and Commodore James Nicholson, an officer in the Continental Navy during the Revolutionary War. His grandfather was from a well-connected Maryland family and was the elder brother to Samuel and John Nicholson, both of whom were also officers in the Continental Navy.

== Career ==
While his father helped broker the Treaty of Ghent, which ended the War of 1812 between Britain and the United States, James acted as his personal secretary during this diplomatic trip. After the success at Ghent, the Gallatins traveled to France just as Napoleon arrived at Cannes after escaping Elba. James' diary includes a detailed look into the lives of the nobles as they faced the threat of Napoleon's return. At one point, he is asked by the famous artist Jacques-Louis David to sit as a cherub for his painting l'Amour et Psyche:

3 March 1815. — We were received privately this morning by the King, only the Duchesse d'Angouleme was present. She looked very sad. The King moved to the embrasure of a window, motioning to Father to follow him, they remained in conversation for a quarter of an hour. Amongst other things His Majesty intimated a wish that Father would be sent as Minister to Paris adding, "you must not forget that your family belonged to France, before you belonged to America." The Duchess talked to me most graciously, asked me about my Mother and said "You are too young to begin political life. I assured her I was 18; she exclaimed "Mais c'est un bebe." Monsieur David the great Artist has requested Father to allow me to pose to him for Cupid, Father has consented and I sit tomorrow.

Gallatin succeeded his father as the president of the Gallatin National Bank in 1839. After his retirement in 1868 he relocated to Paris, France.

=== Published journal ===
His journal entries from his 1814-15 voyage were published in the September 1914 issue of Scribner's Magazine and include a detailed historical account of the negotiations and infighting between the American representatives as well as with the British delegates. However, Raymond Walters, biographer of Albert Gallatin, and other historians believe the diary to be a forgery. Walters wrote "... I reached the conclusion that the diary is a complete fraud." Walters notes that no manuscript for the diary has survived or was ever known to have been seen by anybody other than James Gallatin.

== Personal life ==
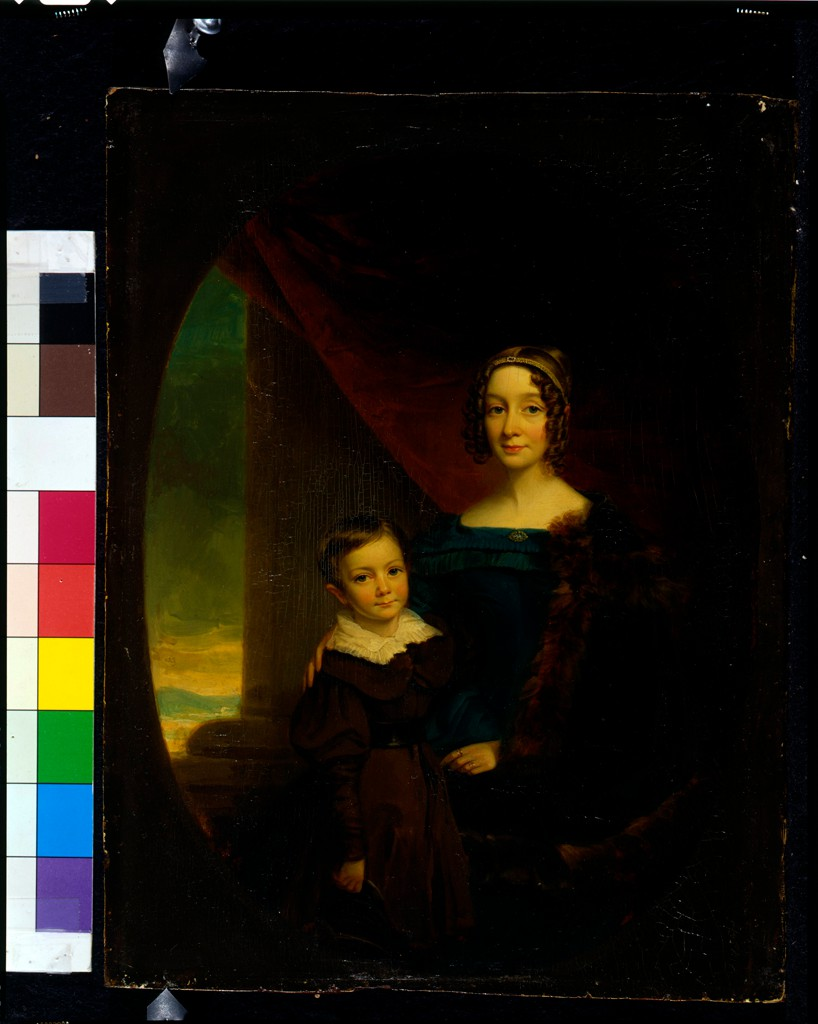
Portrait of his wife, Josephine, and their son, Albert Gallatin II, c. 1837–1840, Fogg Museum

In April 1834, after deciding against marrying Eliza Astor, the youngest daughter of John Jacob Astor, Gallatin was married to Josephine Mary Pascault (1801–1885), a daughter of Louis Pascault, Marquis de Poleon, who built Pascault Row in Baltimore. Her elder sister Henriette married the French General Jean-Jacques Reubell (who came to Baltimore with Jerome Bonaparte, later King of Westphalia) and her other sister, Eleanora, married Gen. Columbus O'Donnell of Baltimore. Together, they were the parents of:

- Albert Gallatin II (1825–1858), who married Henrietta Duer Robinson (1828–1893), a daughter of Morris Robinson and Henrietta Elizabeth (née Duer) Robinson (a daughter of Continental Congressman William Duer).
- Andrew Gallatin (b. 1826), who died young.

Gallatin died on May 29, 1876, in Paris. His widow also died in Paris in 1885.
