= Pascault Row =

Historic house in Maryland, US

- U.S. National Register of Historic Places
- U.S. Historic district
- Baltimore City Landmark
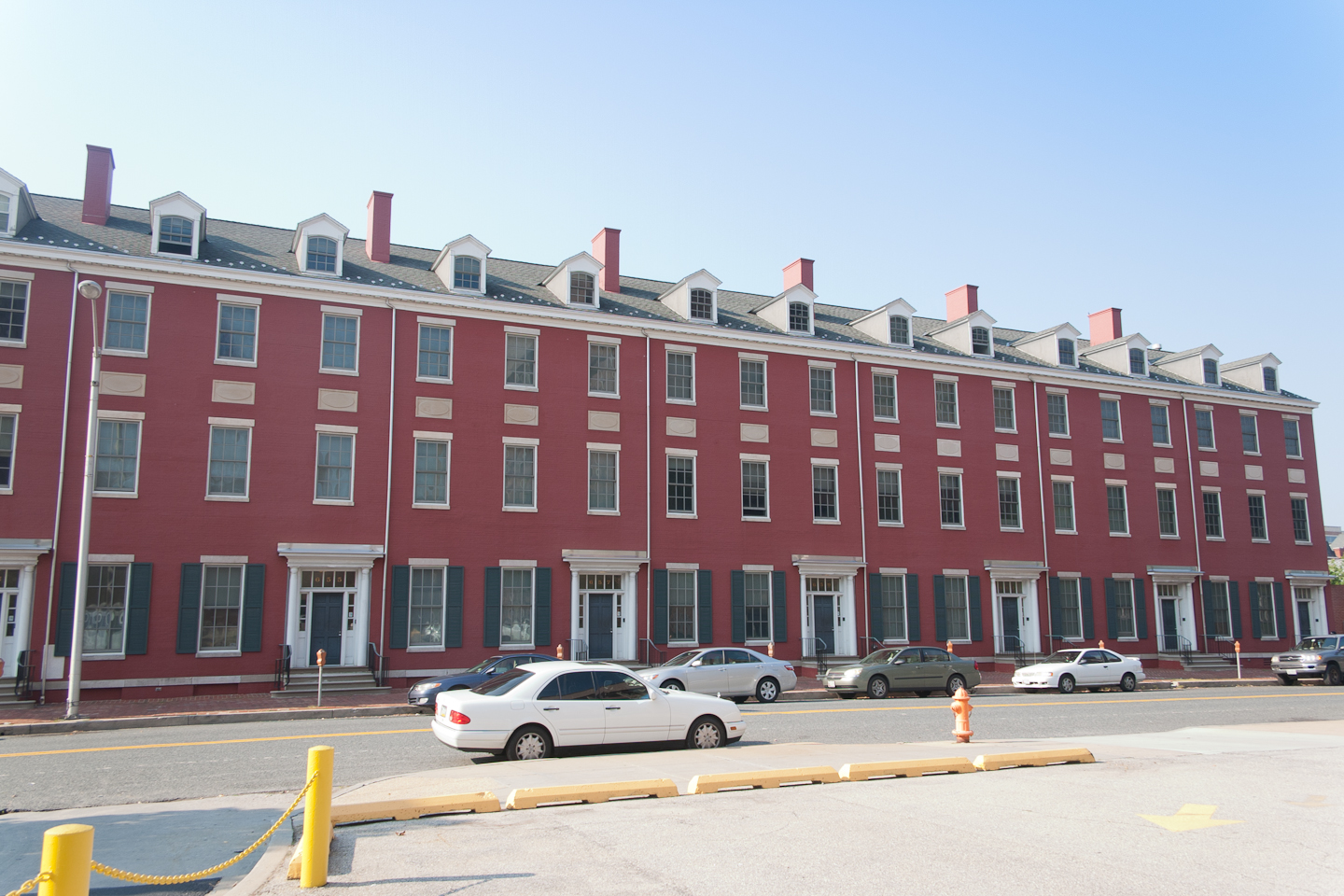
- Pascault Row, August 2011
- Interactive map of Pascault Row
- Location: 651-665 W. Lexington St., Baltimore, Maryland
- Coordinates: 39°17′28″N 76°37′35″W
- Area: 1 acre (0.40 ha)
- Built: 1819
- Architect: Small, William F.
- Architectural style: Greek Revival, Federal, Transitional
- NRHP reference No.: 73002193

Significant dates
- Added to NRHP: January 29, 1973
- Designated BCL: 1987

Pascault Row is a national historic district in Baltimore, Maryland, United States. It was built by Louis Pascault, Marquis de Poleon and consists of a range of eight 3 1/2-story dwellings. It is Baltimore's last remaining example of early-19th-century townhouses, and illustrates the transition between the Federal and the early Greek Revival periods. They are attributed to William F. Small, at that time employed in the architectural office of Benjamin Henry Latrobe.

It was added to the National Register of Historic Places in 1973.
