= Cupid and Psyche (disambiguation) =

Cupid and Psyche is a story in Greek and Roman myth.

Cupid and Psyche may also refer to:

- Cupid and Psyche (Capitoline Museums), a 1st or 2nd century CE Roman statue
- Cupid and Psyche (Legros), an 1867 painting by Alphonse Legros
- Cupid and Psyche (Reynolds), a 1789 painting by Joshua Reynolds
- Cupid and Psyche (Thorvaldsen), a sculpture by Bertel Thorvaldsen
- Cupid and Psyche (van Dyck), a painting by Anthony van Dyck
- Cupid & Psyche 85, an album by art pop band Scritti Politti
