= Louis Pascault, Marquis de Poleon =

French-American aristocrat and architect

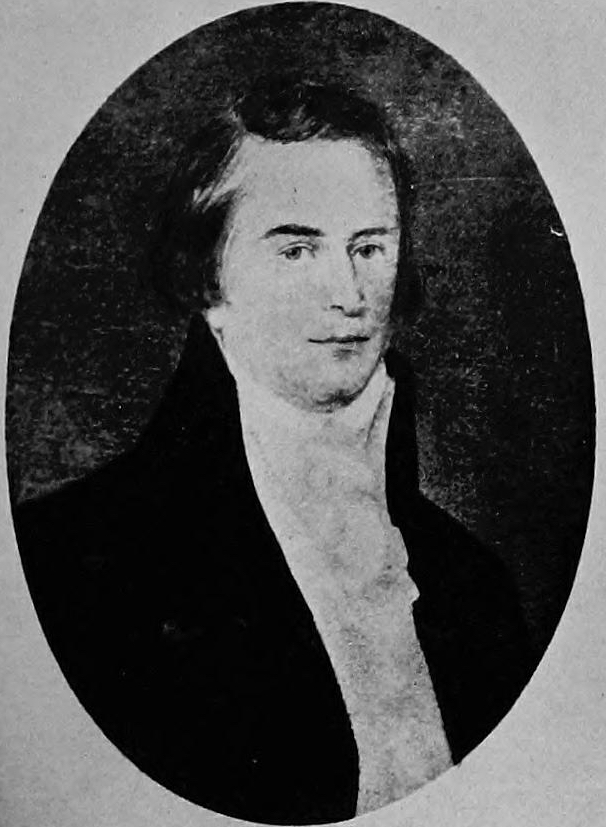
Lewis Pascault

Jean-Charles-Marie-Louis-Felix Pascault, Marquis de Poléon (c. 1749 – May 31, 1824) was a French-American aristocrat best known today for building Pascault Row in Baltimore.

== Early life ==
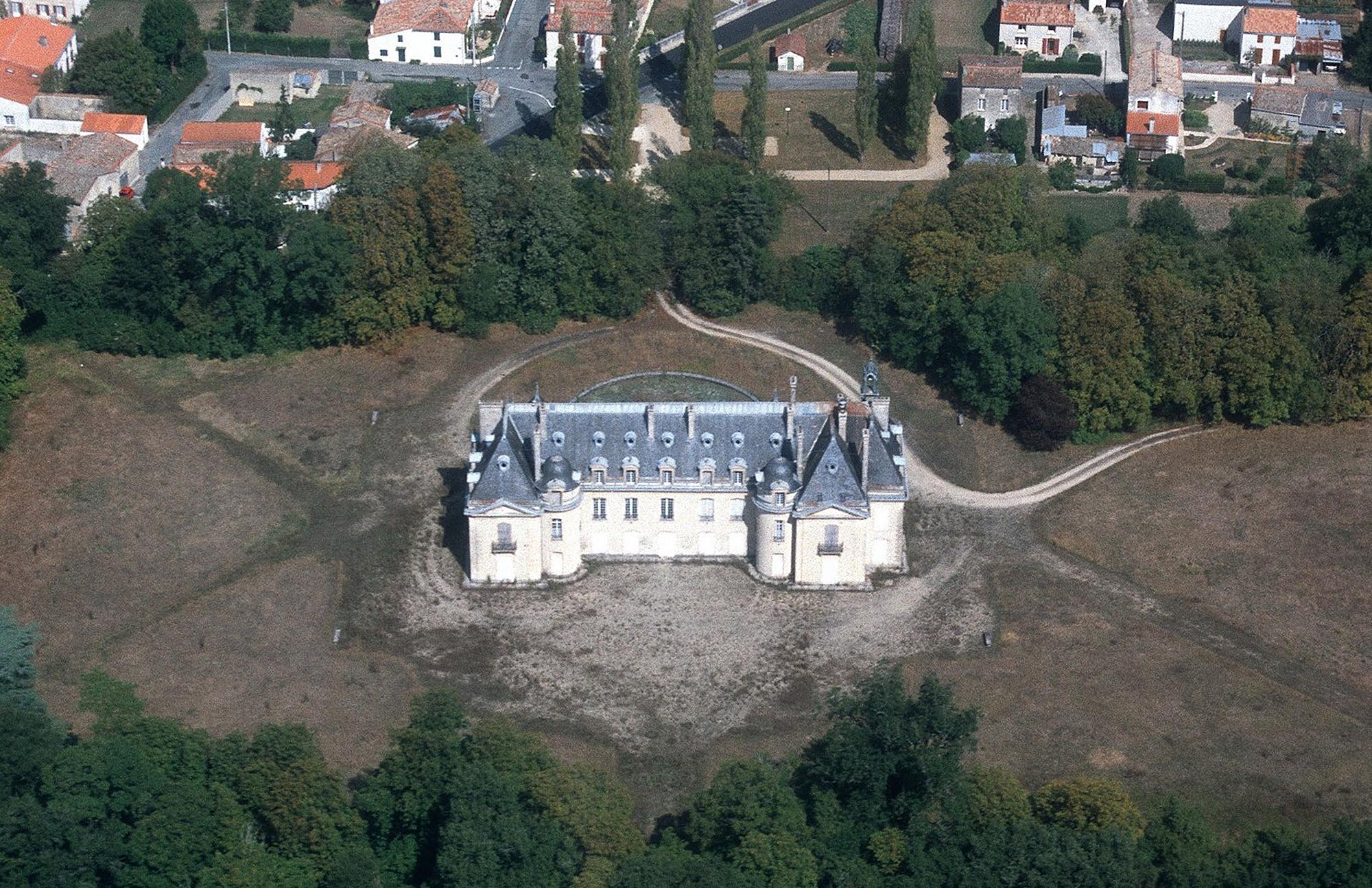
The Château de Poléon in Saint-Georges-du-Bois

Pascault was born in France the son of Anne Marie Pascault and Jean-Charles-Alexandre Pascault, Marquis de Poléon (1717–1779), Captain of Laval Infantry, who married in 1747. His brother was Alexandre Pascault, Marquis de Poléon, who married Jeanne-Henriette Cochon-Dupuy. (Note: After his brother Alexandre died in 1780, his widow married Louis-Maximilien-Alexandre, Count de Hanache.)

His maternal grandparents were Marguerite (née Bouat) and Antoine Pascault (1665–1717), a merchant who traded between La Rochelle and Canada. His paternal grandparents were Françoise Potard and Jehan Pascault, Marquis de Poléon. His ancestor Jean Pascault bought the barony, land and seigneury of Poléon in Saint-Georges-du-Bois in 1635 for 40,000 livres from Marguerite, Duchess of Rohan. In 1638, during the reign of Louis XIII, the family tore down the old château and constructed the Château de Poléon.

== Career ==
Pascault moved to the prosperous French colony of Saint-Domingue, today known as Haiti, to make his fortune. Following the Haitian Revolution (where two of his children were killed with their nurses), Pascault and his family fled their plantation and escaped from Saint-Domingue, emigrating to America, instead of France, because of the revolution there (his family's estate in France was watched over by the Count de Hanache, the second husband of his late brother's widow).

=== Life in America ===
Around 1790, he settled in Baltimore, Maryland at Chatsworth, a large country mansion on Saratoga Street between Pine and Green, that was formerly the estate of Continental Congressman Edward Biddle. He became a prominent merchant, quickly profiting from the rapidly growing city's booming trade. In 1793, Pascault received approximately 1,500 refugees from Saint-Domingue "when their homes were lost in a slave revolt" and "arranged for their shelter and livelihood and established a library for their use which later became the Library Co. of Baltimore."

In 1816, Pascault, together with master builder Rezin Wight and merchant William Lorman (and president of the Bank of Baltimore), commissioned William F. Small to design the row of Federal style houses adjacent to his estate known as Pascault Row. The row of eight houses were constructed in 1819 on Lexington Street and, today, are among the earliest examples of the Baltimore rowhouse. The row became home to some of Baltimore's wealthiest and most prominent families, including his son-in-law, Gen. Columbus O'Donnell, and Bishop William Rollinson Whittingham.

Reportedly, it was at a dinner party at the Marquis de Poleon's residence that Jérôme Bonaparte, the youngest brother of Napoleon I and later King of Westphalia, was formally introduced to the close friend of his daughter Henriette, Elizabeth Patterson, who was herself the daughter of Maryland businessman and founder of the Baltimore and Ohio Railroad William Patterson. Bonaparte fell in love with Elizabeth and married her in 1803.

== Personal life ==
In 1789, Pascault was married to Mary Magdalen Slye (1763–1830) of St. Charles, Maryland, who belonged to a wealthy tobacco merchant and planter family. Together, they were the parents of at least one son and three daughters, including:

- Louis Charles Pascault, Marquis de Poléon (1790–1867), a captain in the Mexican War who married Ann E. Goldsborough (1787–1855), a daughter of Howes Goldsborough of Pleasant Valley in Easton, Maryland (son of Hon. Robert Goldsborough), in 1810.
- Henriette Pascault (1784–1828), who married French Gen. Jean-Jacques Reubell, who came to Baltimore with Bonaparte.
- Eleanora C. Pascault (1799–1870), who married Gen. Columbus O'Donnell, president of Baltimore's Gas and Light Company, and son of prominent merchant John O'Donnell.
- Josephine Mary Pascault (1801–1885), who married James Gallatin, eldest son of Albert Gallatin, the 4th U.S. Secretary of the Treasury who served as the U.S. Ambassador to the United Kingdom and France.

Pascault was an active member of St. Peter's Roman Catholic Church (the predecessor to the Baltimore Cathedral), but was excommunicated by Archbishop Ambrose Maréchal in "a dispute over his daughter's marriage to a non-Catholic."

The Marquis de Poléon died on May 31, 1824, in Baltimore. The Château de Poléon remained in the hands of the Pascault family for many years.

=== Descendants ===
Through his daughter Henriette, he was a grandfather of Jean Louis Alfred Reubell (1805–1876) and Jérôme Napoléon Frédéric Reubell (1809–1874), who married Julia Christiana Coster (a daughter of John Gerard Coster). His great-granddaughter, Henrietta Reubell (c. 1849–1924), was a prominent figure in Paris society who known for hosting a lively salon at her apartment at 42 avenue Gabriel, including James McNeill Whistler, Oscar Wilde, Edith Wharton, and Henry James.
