= New Rochelle Historic Sites =

In Westchester County, New York

New Rochelle Historic Site is a designation of the Historical and Landmarks Review Board (HLRB), for buildings, structures, monuments and other historically significant properties in the city of New Rochelle in Westchester County, New York. Significant sites are chosen after meeting a combination of criteria, including historical, economic, architectural, artistic, cultural, and social values.

Settled by French refugees in the 1680s, New Rochelle grew from a farming community to a resort town to a suburban community before being incorporated as a city in 1899 and is now the seventh largest city in the state.

In 1998 a consultant for the Historical and Landmarks Review Board was commissioned to prepare a Reconnaissance Level Cultural Resources Survey, an analysis of the most significant historic sites and structures in New Rochelle. The project inventoried one historic district and 78 individual properties that fall within a broad spectrum of land use categories. The principal goal of the survey was to identify the City’s most treasured historic and architectural resources which are documented on New York State inventory forms. Each individual resource was evaluated with respect to its eligibility for listing in the National Register of Historic Places. The report follows the format established by SHPO, including the methodology for the survey, criteria for the selection of resources to be inventoried, a historical overview of the project area, a summary of cultural themes identified in the survey, an examination of the stylistic development of historic architecture in New Rochelle, and a narrative description of the existing conditions of the project area.

== Listings ==
Below is the list of New Rochelle Historic Sites, including names, dates of construction, location details and additional background information if available.

	Name	Image	Date	Location	Description
1	Thomas Paine Cottage		1750	20 Sicard Avenue	(Huguenot & New Rochelle Historical Association); Local-designation; National Landmark & NRHP designation
2	Davenport House		1859	157 Davenport Avenue	designed by architect Alexander Jackson Davis; NRHP designated
3	Pioneer Building		1897	14 Lawton Street	#83004217 NRHP designation
4	Lispenard-Rodman-Davenport House		1696	180 Davenport Avenue	#86002637 NRHP designated
5	Rochelle Park-Rochelle Heights Historic District		1893	Downtown	NRHP & local level "Historic District" designation (East side of North Avenue: southern edge abuts I-95/New Haven Railroad corridor; northern boundary of Fifth Avenue, and easterly boundary of rear lot lines of properties on east side of Rockland Place and west side of Potter Avenue)
6	New Rochelle Post Office		1936	225 North Avenue	NRHP designated
7	New Rochelle Train Station		1884	Depot Plaza	NRHP designated
8	Knickerbocker Press Complex & American White Cross Building		1885	50–52 Webster Avenue	NRHP designated
9	Leland Castle		1855	29 Castle Place	NRHP designated; Part of the College of New Rochelle’s main campus
10	Trinity-St. Paul’s Episcopal Church and Parish House		1864	311 Huguenot Street	NRHP designated
11	First Presbyterian Church & Lewis Pintard House		1760	50 Pintard Avenue	NRHP designated
12	Wildcliff		1855	42 Wildcliff Road	NRHP designated - 2002
13	Huguenot & Allaire Family Burial Grounds (Cemetery)		1750	38 Centre Avenue	1750: earliest known tombstone; 1955: re-interment
14	Daniel Webster School		1930	95 Glenmore Drive	Heritage Award Property
15	Israel Seacord House		1775	1337 North Avenue	Heritage Award Property
16	St. John's Wilmot Church		1859	11 Wilmot Road	Heritage Award Property
17	Zion Baptist Church		1925	50 Lockwood Avenue	Heritage Award Property
18	Coutant Cemetery		1776	Eastchester Road and Webster Avenue	Private cemetery; Westchester County Historical Site
19	M.E. Church – Upper New Rochelle		1898	1228 North Avenue	Heritage Award Property
20	Thanhouser Studios		1914	310-316 Main Street	
21	Henry Barnard School		1930	129 Barnard Road	
22	Thomas Paine Memorial Museum and Library		1925	983 North Avenue	Thomas Paine National Historical Association
23	Norman Rockwell House & Studio		1926	24 Lord Kitchener Road	
24	New Rochelle Armory		1932	250 Main Street	
25	Carrie Chapman Catt House		1907	120 Paine Avenue	
26	Brookside		1696	260 Wilmot Road	Joshua Soulice House; Francis T. Hunter House
27	517 – 519 Main Street		1925	517 - 519 Main Street	
28	John Stephenson House		1869	148 Main Street	"Clifford"; Now part of Salesian High School
29	Mahlstedt House		1869	794 North Avenue	Heritage Award Property: Present day Huguenot Children's Library
30	Leonard Seacord House		1790	1074 North Avenue	Heritage Award Property
31	New Rochelle High School		1926	265 Clove Road	
32	Quaker Ridge Station, NYW&B Railroad		1911	Kewanee Road	State-determined eligible for NRHP
33	Parcot - Drake House		1751	188 Clove Road	Oldest existing single family residence
34	Blue Anchor		1920	1 Byworth Road	Heritage Award Property; former Claire Briggs residence
35	St.Gabriel's Catholic Church		1893	120 Division Street	
36	Standard Star Building		1924	251 North Avenue	
37	Fort Slocum; Davids Island Historic and Archeology District		1800	David Island in Long Island Sound, off New Rochelle	State-determined Eligible for National Register designation
38	Masonic Temple Building		1901	451-453 Main Street	Heritage Award Property
39	North Avenue Presbyterian Church		1907	471 North Avenue	
40	Pell-Bayley-Kemball House		1761	145 Pelham Road	
41	Huguenot Yacht Club		1910	Harbor Lane	Heritage Award Property; former residence of film actress Lillian Gish
42	Isaac E. Young Middle School		1929	270 Centre Avenue	Heritage Award Property
43	Terrytoons		1916	38 Centre Avenue	State determined eligible for National Register designation
44	New Rochelle Fire Station No.1		1899	12 Church Street	Heritage Award Property
45	Fire Station No. 2		1923	170 Webster Avenue	Heritage Award Property
46	New Rochelle Fire Station No. 3		1912	756 North Avenue	Heritage Award Property
47	Fire Station No. 4		1916	155 Drake Avenue	Heritage Award Property
48	Anshe Sholom Synagogue		1903	13 Bonnefoy Place	Westchester Vineyard Fellowship
49	National City Bank of New Rochelle		1908	491 Main Street	
50	Clarke-Berrian House		1770	1120 North Avenue	
51	City Hall		1906	515 North Avenue	Formerly New Rochelle High School and Albert Leonard Jr. High School
52	Clovelly Building		1913	358-364 North Avenue	Norman Rockwell studio
53	Lambden Building		1894	530 Main Street	Heritage Award Property
54	Palace Building		1932	518 Main Street	
55	Loew’s Theater Building		1926	585-599 Main Street	
56	Keith Albee-Proctor’s Theatre RKO Theatre Building		1927	574-590 Main Street	Former RKO Movie Theater, now the site of "The Hallen School" and a school supply store.
57	573-579 Main Street		1929	Main Street	
58	Sophia Brewster Schoolhouse		1825	20 Sicard Avenue	Huguenot and New Rochelle Historical Association
59	Blessed Sacrament Roman Catholic Church		1897	Centre Avenue at Shea Place	
60	Union Baptist Church		1904	428 Main Street	Westchester County Inventory of Historic Places
61	St. Joseph's Roman Catholic Church		1904	280 Washington Avenue	
62	Oaksmere School		1879	590 Davenport Avenue	
63	Leonard Seacord House		1790	1074 North Avenue	
64	Dickerman Barns		1906	Ward Acres, Quaker Ridge Road	
65	Joseph E. Leyendecker House		1914	48 Mount Tom Road	Former estate and studio of famed illustrator Joseph E. Leyendecker
66	New Rochelle Rowing Club		1900	Hudson Park	Heritage Award Property
67	New Rochelle Carnegie Library		1913	662 Main Street	(Hagedorn Building)
68	Jefferson School		1932	131–155 Weyman Avenue	Heritage Award property
69	Lou Gehrig House		1905	9 Meadow Lane	Private home located in Residence Park
70	Starin’s Glen Island		1881	Glen Island Access Road off of Pelham Road	County-owned Park and Private Catering Hall; State-determined Eligible for National Register (bridge and castle)
71	New Rochelle Trust Building		1883	542 Main Street	
72	Ware's Department Store (New York)		1914	550 Main Street	
73	Hudson Park		1883	Hudson Park Road	
74	Davenport Park		1929	Davenport Avenue	

== See also ==
- National Register of Historic Places listings in New Rochelle, New York
