= National Register of Historic Places listings in New Rochelle, New York =

This is a list of the National Register of Historic Places entries in New Rochelle, New York. See also National Register of Historic Places listings in Westchester County, New York for all others in the county.

This is intended to be a complete list of properties and districts listed on the National Register of Historic Places in New Rochelle, New York. The locations of National Register properties and districts (at least for all showing latitude and longitude coordinates below) may be seen in an online map by clicking on "Map of all coordinates".

This National Park Service list is complete through NPS recent listings posted June 20, 2025.

Contents: Counties in New York
Albany (Albany) – Allegany – Bronx – Broome – Cattaraugus – Cayuga – Chautauqua – Chemung – Chenango – Clinton – Columbia – Cortland – Delaware – Dutchess (Poughkeepsie, Rhinebeck) – Erie (Buffalo) – Essex – Franklin – Fulton – Genesee – Greene – Hamilton – Herkimer – Jefferson – Kings – Lewis – Livingston – Madison – Monroe (Rochester) – Montgomery – Nassau – New York (Below 14th Street, 14th to 59th Streets, 59th to 110th Streets, Above 110th Street, Islands) – Niagara (Niagara Falls) – Oneida – Onondaga (Syracuse) – Ontario – Orange – Orleans – Oswego – Otsego – Putnam – Queens – Rensselaer – Richmond – Rockland – St. Lawrence – Saratoga – Schenectady – Schoharie – Schuyler – Seneca – Steuben – Suffolk – Sullivan – Tioga – Tompkins – Ulster – Warren – Washington – Wayne – Westchester (Northern, Southern, New Rochelle, Peekskill, Yonkers) – Wyoming – Yates

== Current listings ==
	Name on the Register	Image	Date listed	Location	City or town	Description
1	Davenport House	Davenport House	April 30, 1980 (#80002791)	157 Davenport Rd. 40°54′05″N 73°46′17″W	New Rochelle	Gothic Revival style cottage designed by influential architect Alexander Jackson Davis; built in 1859
2	First Presbyterian Church and Lewis Pintard House	First Presbyterian Church and Lewis Pintard House	September 7, 1979 (#79001648)	Pintard Ave. 40°54′16″N 73°47′07″W	New Rochelle	
3	Knickerbocker Press Building	Knickerbocker Press Building	May 11, 2000 (#00000487)	50-52 Webster Ave. 40°54′17″N 73°47′29″W	New Rochelle	
4	Leland Castle	Leland Castle	August 27, 1976 (#76001291)	29 Castle Pl. 40°53′52″N 73°46′53″W	New Rochelle	
5	Lispenard-Rodman-Davenport House	Lispenard-Rodman-Davenport House	September 22, 1986 (#86002637)	180 Davenport Ave. 40°54′04″N 73°46′17″W	New Rochelle	
6	New Rochelle Railroad Station	New Rochelle Railroad Station	October 14, 2009 (#09000837)	Between N. Ave. and Memorial Hwy. 40°54′44″N 73°47′06″W	New Rochelle	
7	Thomas Paine Cottage	Thomas Paine Cottage	November 28, 1972 (#72000920)	20 Sicard Ave. 40°56′01″N 73°47′29″W	New Rochelle	Home of Thomas Paine, author of "Common Sense", and other Revolutionary pamphlets.
8	Pioneer Building	Pioneer Building	December 29, 1983 (#83004217)	14 Lawton St. 40°54′36″N 73°46′56″W	New Rochelle	
9	Rochelle Park-Rochelle Heights Historic District	Rochelle Park-Rochelle Heights Historic District	July 6, 2005 (#05000664)	The Circle, The Boulevard, The Serpentine, Hamilton Ave. and others 40°55′29″N 73°46′50″W	New Rochelle	
10	Sailing Vessel Gitana	Sailing Vessel Gitana	November 27, 2024 (#100011073)	New Rochelle Lower Harbor; 40°53′19″N 73°47′06″W	New Rochelle	
11	Trinity-St. Paul's Episcopal Church	Trinity-St. Paul's Episcopal Church	July 12, 2006 (#06000576)	311 Huguenot St. 40°54′41″N 73°47′05″W	New Rochelle	
12	US Post Office-New Rochelle	US Post Office-New Rochelle	May 11, 1989 (#88002368)	255 North Ave. 40°54′41″N 73°46′56″W	New Rochelle	
13	Wildcliff	Wildcliff	December 31, 2002 (#02001656)	42 Wildcliff Rd. 40°54′23″N 73°46′12″W	New Rochelle	Alexander Jackson Davis mansion built in 1852, sometimes known as Cyrus Lawton House. Destroyed in 2018 fire.

== See also ==
- National Register of Historic Places listings in New York
- National Register of Historic Places listings in southern Westchester County, New York
- New Rochelle Historic Sites
