= Winyah Park =

Country estate in Mew Rochelle, New York, U.S.

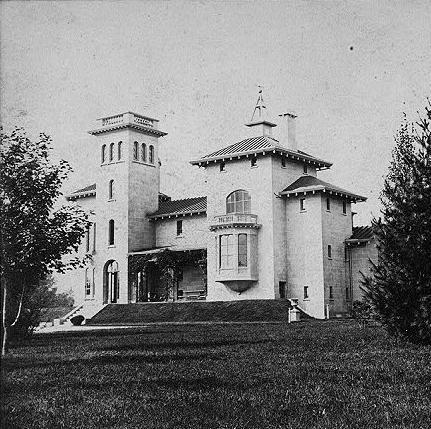
Winyah Park

Winyah Park (later known as Lathers Hill) was the 300-acre country estate of Colonel Richard Lathers, located in the village of New Rochelle, Westchester County, New York, upon which a number of 19th-century Gothic villas and cottages designed by Alexander Jackson Davis were built. It was in 1848, after a brief but successful business career in New York, that, attracted by the accessibility and the natural environment of New Rochelle, Colonel Richard Lathers purchased a large country estate and farm along the New Rochelle and Pelham border. Three years later, in 1851, Lathers employed his personal friend and renowned architect Alexander Jackson Davis to design him a more seemly and dignified residence than the old farmhouse which existed. Revolutionizing the traditional single-house form that dominated colonial and early 19th-century domestic architecture, Davis was creating many of the country's finest villas and cottages in an entirely new, purely American style. The residence designed for Lathers was the landmark brick and marble Italian villa "Winyah", named for Lathers former estate in Winyah Parish, South Carolina.

== Winyah ==
"Winyah" was one of approximately eighteen or more Italianate houses designed by Davis in the 1850s. It was for this particular design that Davis received top honors at the World's Fair held in New York. Davis used Winyah's most striking feature, two adjacent but contrasting towers, in a much larger house named "Grace Hill", built in Brooklyn between 1854 and 1857. In both Winyah and Grace Hill, broad octagonal towers function as visual anchors for the taller square towers that incorporate entrance porches at ground level and look-outs on the fourth story. In addition, Winyah had a raised platform with urns at two of its corners and a truncated column at a third.

=== Lost to fire ===
Winyah was one of the best known landmarks of the vicinity of New Rochelle up until May 5, 1897, when the residence burned to the ground along with its many valuable contents. The mansion was purchased from Col. Richard Lathers by Col. C. H. Green, President of Columbia Construction and Navigation Company. He occupied it with his wife and four-year-old nephew, and three servants including a 'waitress', 'laundress' and cook. In the early morning hours the waitress awoke to the smell of smoke alerting the other occupants to flee the house. The cook ran into New Rochelle village to secure assistance. The Fire Department, with two engines, a horse cart, and a truck, responded, though the mansion was about one and a half miles from the center of town. When they arrived, however, attempts to access water from a hydrant were foiled by pebbles stuck within its piping. Nearly 100 men came with fire apparatus, but without water they could do nothing to halt the worsening flames. Green offered a reward for anyone who could save two pictures from the gallery within the home. However, nothing in the house could be saved and within two hours the entire structure was in ruins. The sixty-nine-foot tower in the front of the home collapsed into the center of the burning building, only two brick chimneys being left standing in the end.

Colonel Green estimated his loss at $100,000. The home and the furniture were insured for approximately $35,000. Mrs. Green lost her diamonds and jewelry valued at $10,000. Also lost to the fire was a large and valuable library as well as several paintings by Corot, Schreyer, and Sontag. One painting, ironically saved from his mother's home while it was burning, was particularly prized by Col. Green who valued it at $5,000. The mansion contained thirty-five rooms, had originally cost $63,000, and underwent considerable cosmetic improvements prior to the fire during Col. Green's ownership.

The theory behind its destruction was that the fire was caused by the spontaneous combustion of some rags soaked with a floor-cleaning compound containing turpentine and oil which had been left in the lamp room.

== Lathers Woods ==
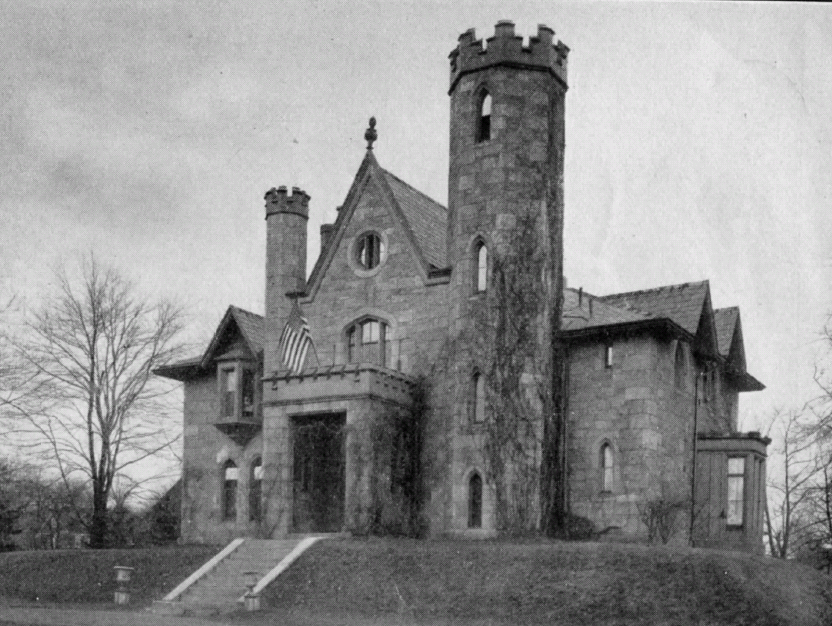
“Tudor Villa” at Lathers Woods

In the late 1850s, Lathers decided to build a number of "investment" houses on a portion of his property which was later named "Lathers Woods". Once again he retained his friend Davis the architect for this project which included a total of four homes, three of them designed in 1858 (including "Tudor Villa", "The Rambler" and "Gothic Cottage"), and one the following year in 1859 ("Pointed Villa"). The homes were well planned for spaciousness and dignity of interior effect considering their not extravagant dimensions. In 1890, the artist Frederic Remington purchased one of these cottages from which he created his estate and studio where he lived most of his artistic career. The Remingtons' substantial gothic revival house located at 301 Webster Avenue, featured a sweeping lawn which sloped south toward Long Island Sound, providing views on three sides of the countryside. Remington called it "Endion", an Algonquin word meaning "the place where I live". Remington and his wife, Eva, moved to New Rochelle in 1890, three years after he had begun his professional career as an illustrator and painter. The community was close to New York City affording easy access to the publishing houses and galleries necessary for the artist, and also rural enough to provide him with the space he needed for horseback riding, and other physical activities that relieved the long hours of concentration required by his work. Moreover, an artists' colony had grown up in the town, so that the Remingtons counted among their neighbors writers, actors, and artists such as Augustus Thomas, also from Lathers Hill, and Francis Wilson, Julian Hawthorne, Edward Kemble.

The success of both Winyah and Lathers' Woods generated further important commissions for Davis in New Rochelle including the Davenport family's cottage-villas Wildcliff and Sans Souci, and Col. Delancey Kane's Davenport Neck estate "The Paddocks".

=== Later development ===
Development plan for Winyahwood

A dairy farm, operated by Walsh Brothers Dairy, rented some 120 acres for $35 a month. At first, Lathers paid taxes only to Pelham however when New Rochelle became a city in 1900, Lathers was pressed to pay taxes there. He later sold the property to Winyah Park Realty, and it was sold once more, to Clifford B. Harmon who began the rapid development of the area. An undated item in the New York Times, published between 1906 and 1909, reads:

"William Bradley Randall; Charles T. Barney, Pres. Knickerbocker Trust Co.; Col. Walloch of Walloch & Cook, attorneys; Frederick L. Eldridge, V. P. Knickerbocker Trust Co., have purchased from Richard Lathers Estate, the tract of land known as Winyah Park. It contains 132 acres of rolling land. They have incorporated a land improvement company known as the Winyah Park Realty Co. The company intends to lay out the property as a high class residential park. John H. Murphy was the broker that put the deal through for the Lathers Estate. Mr. Murphy has been made a Director of the company. Washington L. Jaques, proprietor of the Murray Hill Hotel, and Thos. Leclaire Jaques, President of the Village of Pelham (1906-1909) have organized a hotel company, with strong financial backing, to erect an up-to-date hotel costing $350,000 and containing 300 rooms. They have taken an interest in the land syndicate. It is said the property brought $3,000 an acre."
