= Mahlstedt Lumber and Coal building =

Historic building in New Rochelle, New York

Coordinates: 40.90611°N 73.78691°W

The J.A. Mahlstedt Lumber and Coal building in New Rochelle, Westchester County, New York, is a Neoclassical Revival style building completed in 1920. The building was given New Rochelle Heritage Award in 2010 and designated as a local landmark in 2021.

== History ==
The two-story commercial building located at 415 Huguenot Street is notable for its architectural style and for its deep ties with the cultural heritage of the City of New Rochelle. It originally housed the offices of the J.A. Mahlstedt Lumber and Coal Company, a key part of the New Rochelle economy of the late 19th and early 20th centuries.

=== Architecture ===
The building was designed by architect Lawrence L. Barnard, a graduate of the Columbia School of Architecture and a distinguished New Rochelle citizen in the early 20th century. His architectural firm Barnard and Wilder designed many of the city’s most notable buildings, including the Standard Star Building on North Avenue and the New Rochelle Fire Station #3. The New Rochelle Standard Star described Barnard as “one of the best all-around architects of the city.”

Built in the Neoclassical Revival style, the building is faced with smooth limestone and features four engaged Tuscan columns that divide the façade. Three fanlight windows create archways above the street-level windows. A balustrade tops the entablature, extending across the building’s roofline with the lettering “THE J.A. MAHLSTEDT LUMBER AND COAL COMPANY” engraved into the frieze.

=== The J.A. Mahlstedt Lumber and Coal Company ===
In 1895, first-generation German-American J. Albert Mahlstedt, Jr., incorporated the J.A. Mahlstedt Lumber and Coal Company. The business was first built by his father who sold ice and general merchandise in New Rochelle. The lumber and coal company eventually grew to become “the most extensive in [New Rochelle]” and provided the lumber for many of the historic homes built in New Rochelle.

Under the younger Mahlstedt’s direction, the business erected the building to house the offices of the thriving enterprise. The structure was conveniently located at the west junction of Huguenot and Main Streets, directly in front of the company’s lumber yards and close to a nearby mill on Pine Street.

One of New Rochelle’s most distinguished families, the Mahlstedts owned several businesses, served in public office, and held other positions of importance. In addition to the coal and lumber company, Mahlstedt also owned and/or directed the Holler Ice Manufacturing Company, the New Rochelle Realty Company, the Forest Heights Improvement Company, the Mahlstedt-Steen Securities Corporation, and other concerns. Mahlstedt Senior was a founding member of New Rochelle’s Chamber of Commerce and became a Trustee and Treasurer of the Union Free Schools, while Mahlstedt Junior acted as Vice President of the Standard Improvement Company, served seven years as Treasurer of the City of New Rochelle, and was an appointed member of the New Rochelle Board of Education before his accidental death in 1927.

Following the Great Depression, the Mahlstedt Coal and Lumber Company shuttered, leaving the building vacant. From 1937 to 1938, it served as a temporary site for the city’s Post Office. Over the years, it also housed offices for the New Rochelle Water Company and became the home for the Landis Hardware Store. At some point during its history, the lettering on the upper façade was covered with an aluminum cap.

=== Mahlstedt Gallery ===
In 2008, the building was purchased and underwent extensive renovation. Among other restorations, the aluminum cap was removed from the top of the building restoring the Mahlstedt name and history to the building’s façade. Since 2012 the building has housed the Mahlstedt Gallery, an art gallery specializing in bespoke curation of fine art paintings, sculptures, and interiors.
