= Edwards Pierrepont =

American politician, lawyer, and US Attorney General (1817–1892)

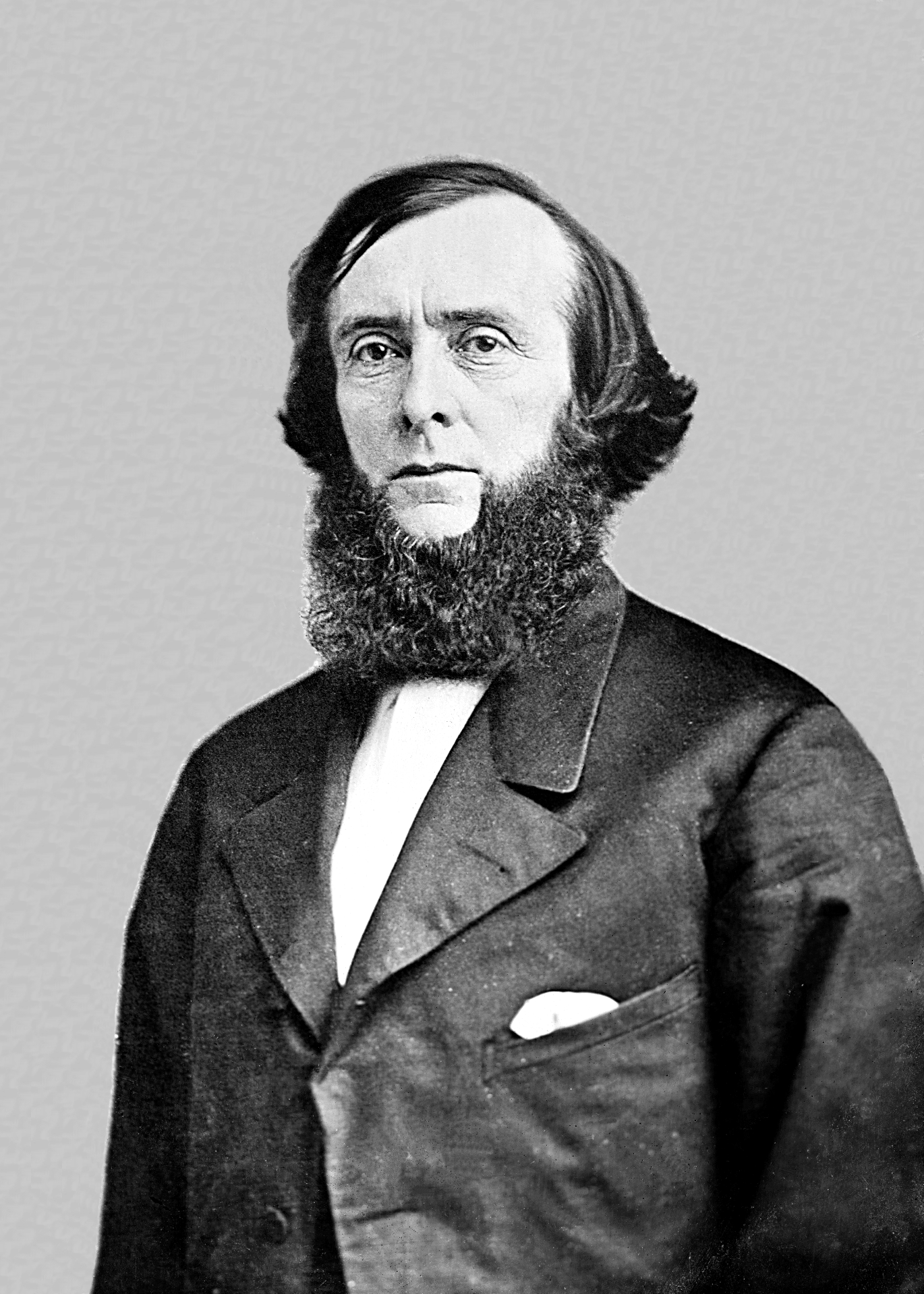
- Pierrepont, c. 1865–1880

United States Minister to the United Kingdom
- In office July 11, 1876 – December 22, 1877
- President: Ulysses S. Grant; Rutherford B. Hayes
- Preceded by: Robert C. Schenck
- Succeeded by: John Welsh

33rd United States Attorney General
- In office April 26, 1875 – May 21, 1876
- President: Ulysses S. Grant
- Preceded by: George Williams
- Succeeded by: Alphonso Taft

United States Attorney for the Southern District of New York
- In office April 25, 1869 – July 20, 1870
- President: Ulysses S. Grant
- Preceded by: Samuel G. Courtney
- Succeeded by: Noah Davis

Personal details
- Born: March 4, 1817 North Haven, Connecticut, U.S.
- Died: March 6, 1892 (aged 75) New York City, U.S.
- Party: Democratic (Before 1868); Republican (1868–1892)
- Spouse: Margaretta Willoughby (m. 1846)
- Children: 2
- Education: Yale University (BA, LLB)

Edwards Pierrepont (March 4, 1817 – March 6, 1892) was an American attorney, reformer, jurist, traveler, New York U.S. Attorney, U.S. Attorney General, U.S. Minister to England, and orator. Having graduated from Yale in 1837, Pierrepont studied law and was admitted to the bar in 1840. During the American Civil War, Pierrepont was a Democrat, although he supported President Abraham Lincoln. Pierrepont initially supported President Andrew Johnson's conservative Reconstruction efforts having opposed the Radical Republicans. In both 1868 and 1872, Pierrepont supported Ulysses S. Grant for president. For his support, President Grant appointed Pierrepont United States Attorney in 1869. In 1871, Pierrepont gained the reputation as a solid reformer, having joined New York's Committee of Seventy that shut down Boss Tweed's corrupt Tammany Hall. In 1872, Pierrepont modified his views on Reconstruction and stated that African American freedman's rights needed to be protected.

In April 1875, Pierrepont was appointed U.S. Attorney General by President Grant, who, having teamed up with Secretary of Treasury Benjamin Bristow, vigorously prosecuted the notorious Whiskey Ring, a national tax evasion swindle that involved whiskey distillers, brokers, and government officials, including President Grant's private secretary, Orville E. Babcock. Upon his appointment, Pierrepont quickly cleaned up corruption in Southern U.S. districts. Pierrepont had continued former Attorney General George H. Williams moratorium on prosecuting the Ku Klux Klan. The Klan had been previously prosecuted by President Grant's Attorneys General Amos T. Akerman and Williams from 1871 to 1873, prosecuting civil rights violations of whites against African Americans. Pierrepont ruled that a naturalized Prussian immigrant's son born in the U.S. was not obligated to serve in the Prussian military as an adult. In his ruling of the Chorpenning Claim, Pierrepont cited the Supreme Court case Gorden v United States, having agreed that the Postmaster General, as well as the Secretary of War, served as ministers rather than legally binding arbitrators for a monetary claim by a private citizen. After serving as Attorney General, Pierrepont was appointed Minister to Great Britain by President Grant serving from 1876 to 1877. After many visits to France, Pierrepont became an advocate for bimetalism. Having returned from England, Pierrepont resumed his law practice until his death in 1892.

== Early life and ancestry ==
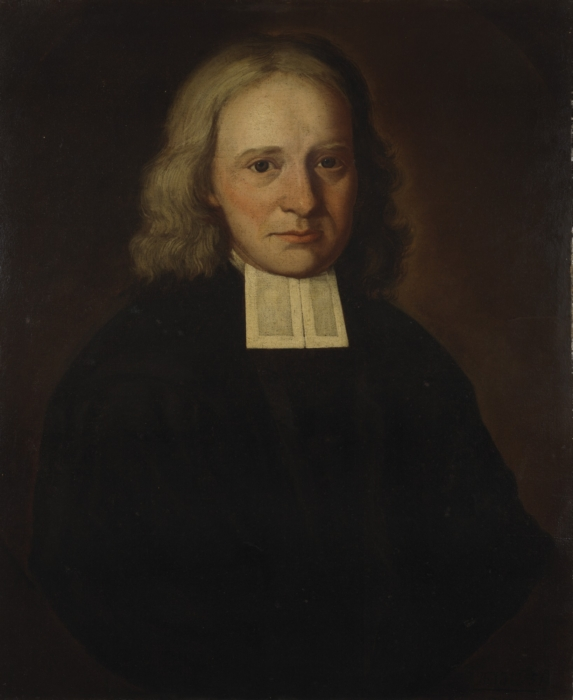
James Pierepont Oil portrait, Pierpont Limner, 1711

Edwards Pierrepont was born in North Haven, Connecticut, on March 4, 1817. He was the son of Giles Pierepont and Eunice Munson Pierepont. Giles Pierepont was a New England descendant of James Pierepont, a cofounder of Yale University. Pierrepont's baptised name was Munson Edwards Pierepont, however, he changed his name to Edwards Pierrepont, dropping Munson and adding an extra "r" to his last name. Pierrepont was an earlier version of his family name.

Pierrepont attend several schools in the North Haven area, enrolled at Yale University, and graduated in 1837. After graduation, Edwards traveled and explored the West, then studied at New Haven Law School. He passed the bar in 1840, and tutored at Yale University from 1840 to 1841. He then moved to Columbus, Ohio where he practiced law with Phineas B. Wilcox from 1840 to 1845. In 1846, Pierrepont moved to New York where he established his own practice.

== Marriage, family, and estates ==
On May 27, 1846, Pierrepont married Margaretta Willoughby, from Brooklyn, the daughter of Samuel Willoughby. Their marriage produced two children, one son, Edwin, and one daughter, Margaretta. Edwin died in Rome in 1885 while serving as Chargé d'Affaires, having replaced Mr. William Astor, the U.S. Envoy, who had retired. Pierrepont's daughter married Leanord F. Beckwith who lived at 48 West Seventy-second Street in New York.

In 1852, Pierrepont completed the construction of his estate house at 103 Fifth Avenue in New York. This would be his permanent residence for the next 40 years. In 1867, Pierrepont built a country estate house in Garrison, designed by architect Alexander Jackson Davis; it was listed on the National Register of Historic Places in 1982 as the Hurst-Pierrepont Estate.

== Political career ==
Upon moving to New York, Pierrepont became active in politics, having joined the Democratic Party in 1846. Pierrepont first served in office when he was elected Superior Court Judge on the New York Supreme Court; he served from 1857 to 1860.

== Civil War ==
Pierrepont was believed to have a pulse on the nation and served as Abraham Lincoln's personal advisor before and after Lincoln was elected president. In 1862, during the Civil War Pierrepont was appointed by President Lincoln a member of the military commission to try the cases of state prisoners in the custody of the federal military authorities. During the Presidential election of 1864, Pierrepont supported Lincoln in a political speech at Cooper Union, believing President Lincoln would secure the restoration of the Union. Pierrepont stated Lincoln stood for freedom, liberty and national glory.

== Prosecuted Surratt trial ==
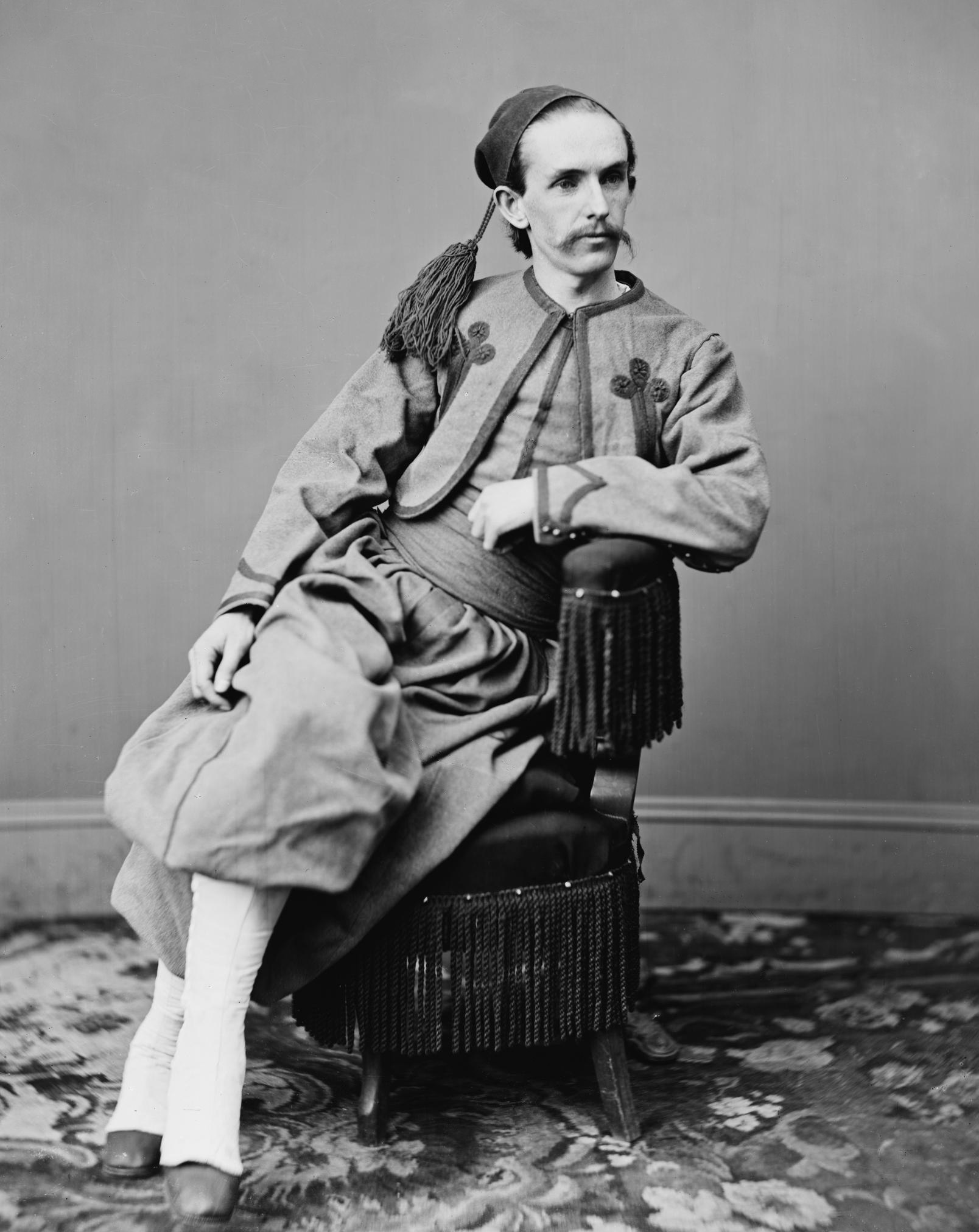
John H. Surratt

In 1867 Pierrepont conducted the case for the government against John H. Surratt, indicted as an accomplice in the murder of President Lincoln. Surratt, a former Confederate spy, was the last person to be tried by a U.S. Military commission in the case of Lincoln's assassination. After Lincoln's assassination, Surratt fled the United States to Montreal, Liverpool, Rome, and was finally caught in Egypt on December 2, 1866, where he was indicted and returned to the United States to face U.S. military trial. The trial opened on June 10, 1867 under Judge George P. Fisher and held immense public interest in the United States. Pierrepont argued that Surratt was involved in the conspiracy to overthrow the U.S. Government and involved with the assassination of Abraham Lincoln by John Wilkes Booth. Pierrepont argued that the military trial was suited for Surratt's case and quoted Bible verses that he viewed supported government was created by God for the express purpose of finding the guilty. Pierrepont argued that because Surratt had assumed an alias name, John Harrison, in staying at a hotel, and had fled the country that this proved his guilt. The trial lasted until August 10, 1867 and ended with the jury unable to make any decision after a seventy-hour deliberation. As a result of the hung jury, Judge Fisher set Surratt free.

== New York constitutional convention member ==
In April 1867, Pierrepont was elected a member of the New York Constitutional Convention serving on the Judiciary Committee. A total of 19 committees were created to study each constitutional revision with Pierrepont's larger Judiciary Committee having a total of 15 members. The Constitutional Convention turned out to be a long drawn-out process of deliberation that lasted into June 1867 whose purpose was to root out any constitutional defects from the previous 1846 New York Constitution. One contentious issue was whether to allow women suffrage and to strike out the word "male" that defined New York voters.

== U.S. Attorney for the Southern District of New York ==
From April 25, 1869 to July 20, 1870 Pierrepont served as U.S. Attorney for the Southern District of New York appointed by President Ulysses S. Grant. As U.S. Attorney, he prosecuted Cuban revolutionaries for violation of the Neutrality Act. On Tuesday June 15, 1869, U.S. Attorney Pierrepont arrested and indicted members of the Cuban Junta, an organization to aid the Cuban Rebellion. Included in the arrests were the Cuban Junta President and other members; Jose Moralez Lemus, Wm. O.C. Ryan, Francisco Fesser, and Jose Mora. The Cuban Junta on May 1, 1869 had organized a military expedition to fight in the Cuban Rebellion against Spain. Other members of the Cuban Junta escaped arrest by the Deputy Marshall Allan. Pierrepont retired as U.S. Attorney and resumed his private law practice.

== Committee of Seventy member ==
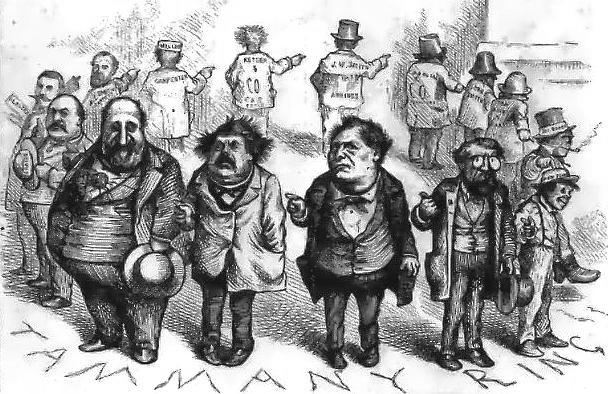
Nast cartoon that lampooned Boss Tweed's Tammany Hall Ring.

After the American Civil War the Democratic Party under Boss William Tweed's Tammany Hall gained a monopoly in both New York City Hall and the New York Legislature. Allegations of corruption rapidly grew as rumors spread that Boss Tweed and associates of Tammany Hall were laundering tax payers money in real estate and bribing New York State legislatures for favorable legislation. New York City workers under the Tammany Hall system were paid excessive rates on the burden of tax payers. By 1871, New York City residents and the press demanded that the corruption be investigated and cleaned up. On September 4, at Cooper Union, a large organization of reputed citizens was formed known as the Committee of Seventy, that investigated the corruption of Boss Tweed's Tammany Hall Ring. Pierrepont was appointed to and actively served on the legislation commission of the Committee of Seventy. The Committee of Seventy promised to thoroughly investigate Tammany Hall corruption and strongly encouraged honest voters to stop taking bribes from Tammany Hall at the polls during election. By the end of October 1871 the Committee of Seventy had successfully stopped funding Boss Tweed's Tammany Hall by court injunction effectively shutting down the corrupt institution. Tweed was arrested and thrown into jail.

== Supported President Grant ==
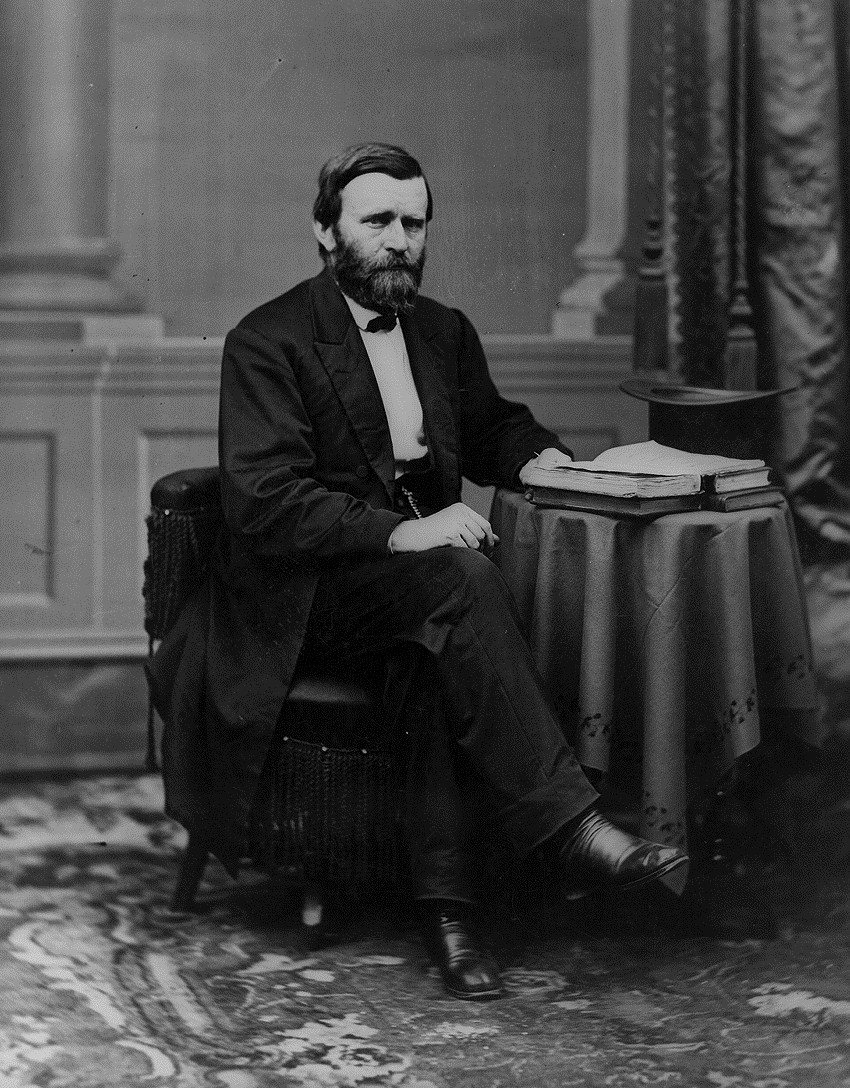
President Ulysses S. Grant —Mathew Brady 1869

On September 25, 1872 reformer Pierrepont gave a speech at the Cooper Union Institute in New York that supported President Grant's reelection. Pierrepont stated that Grant's opponent Horace Greeley had pointed out that Grant had made a better President than expected and that his second term would be better than his first. Pierrepont stated that President Grant had been unjustly slandered by the press, and that he believed "security, confidence, development and unexampled prosperity" would take place during President Grant's second term in office. Pierrepont, who had toured the South in February, spoke on President Grant's Reconstruction policy. Pierrepont had observed that southern whites in poverty supported Greeley, while African Americans were loyal to President Grant. Although acknowledging Reconstruction state governments needed reform, Pierrepont blamed southern poverty on the Southern peoples "swollen pride and obstinate will". Pierrepont believed that Grant's southern policy was good for the Southern people; that African Americans needed to be protected in their rights; and that government needed to govern justly and generously. Pierrepont believed that electing Greeley would turn over the state governments to a rebellious people and reminded his audience of Union prisoner deaths that had taken place at Andersonville and harsh conditions at Libby Prison. As a reformer, Pierrepont stated he would do his best to ensure that honest men were placed around President Grant.

On October 11, 1872 Edwards Pierrepont spoke in Ithaca, New York supporting President Grant and the Republican ticket. Pierrepont related a story of President Grant unworried he would not win North Carolina. Although there was concern that Grant would not win North Carolina, Pierrepont stated that Grant had said to a friend when wolves howl at night the sound is greater than the actual number of wolves. According to President Grant, this was the case in North Carolina. Pierrepont predicted Grant would win New York for seven reasons including that Grant had already won the state in 1868 when the Democratic coalition was at its height, the Republicans had carried the state government, and that Grant would receive 17,000 votes from African Americans. Pierrepont stated the Tammany Ring would no longer be instrumental in securing the Democratic vote through fraud. Pierrepont had earlier been instrumental in prosecuting the Tammany Ring that was completely shut down. With the prosecution of the Ku Klux Klan by President Grant and Pierrepont's shutting down the Tammany Ring, the general election of 1872 was one of the most fair in United States history.

== Saint-Gaudens bust ==
In 1874, Pierrepont hired a young and upcoming Irish born sculptor Augustus Saint-Gaudens to create a marble bust of himself. Pierrepont, who practiced phrenology, believed that having a wide head was a sign of intelligence. Pierrepont was an admirer of Plato, Socrates, and Aristotle and he wanted his head to be wide as theirs were. Pierrepont turned out to be a demanding patron as he insisted Saint-Gaudens make his head larger on the bust. Although Saint-Gaudens complied, he was upset at Pierrepont for having to make his head larger. Saint-Gaudens said that Pierrepont's bust "seemed to be affected with some dreadful swelling disease". Saint-Gaudens was so upset over the Pierrepont portrait sculpture that he later stated to a friend, David Armstrong, he would "give anything to get hold of that bust and smash it to atoms".

== U.S. Attorney General ==
President Ulysses S. Grant appointed Pierrepont Attorney General of the United States on April 26, 1875. A former Democrat, Pierrepont had difficulty fitting into the Grant Administration, as stress was created during his tenure because of the prosecution of the Whiskey Ring and the indictment of Grant's private secretary, American Civil War general, Orville E. Babcock. Pierrepont, a reformer, was teamed up by President Grant with Secretary of Treasury, Benjamin Bristow to rid the government of corruption. Sec. Bristow had discovered whiskey distillers had created a government ring that profiteered by evading payment of taxes on the manufacturing of whiskey. Pierrepont was also involved with Reconstruction, as President Grant administered Southern policy through the Attorney General's Justice Department and the War Department. In terms of southern Reconstruction, Pierrepont continued his predecessor Att. Gen. George H. Williams's Spring, 1873 moratorium of prosecuting civil rights cases and in general was unresponsive to white violent attacks or outrages against African American citizens in the South. Pierrepont was more concerned for the restoration of the United States "international influence and political clout" after the American Civil War and was primarily known for his rulings on international law, naturalization, and extradition. To change his Cabinet coalition, President Grant removed Pierrepont as Attorney General and appointed him minister to Great Britain.

=== Reforms (1875) ===
When Pierrepont assumed the office of U.S. Attorney General, he immediately implemented overdue reform in the South's U.S. Marshal and U.S. Attorney departments. The culmination of these reforms took place in June 1875. Attorney General Pierrepont had given specific reform orders to U.S. Attorneys and U.S. Marshals in the South that were vigorously enforced. Pierrepont ran extensive investigations into the conduct of the U.S. Attorneys and U.S. Marshals, exposing fraud and corruption. Pierrepont was fully sustained by President Grant's endorsement of the investigations, reforms, and persons to be removed and replaced from office.

=== Naturalization (1875) ===
In July 1875 Attorney General Pierrepont ruled on the naturalization case of the son of a Prussian immigrant, Steinkoanler, who had immigrated to the United States in 1848. Steinkoanler was naturalized as a United States citizen in 1854. Steinkoanler returned to Prussia with his son, born in the United States, who was four years old. The naturalization case concerned whether Steinkoanler's son, who was then 20 years old, had to serve in the Prussian military, an obligation for all Prussian male children. Pierrepont ruled that Steinkoanler's son, had both United States and Prussian citizenship, and was only obligated to serve in the Prussian military while under his father's care. However, after Steinkoanler had come of age on his own, he was free to return to the United States and as a U.S. citizen could even run for the President of the United States.

=== Chorpenning claim (1875) ===
On July 25, 1875, Attorney General Pierrepont ruled on what was denounced as a fraud known as the Chorpenning claim. Chorpenning had petitioned the post office in 1857 for payment of mail delivery in San Pedro and Carson's Valley. Chorpenning was paid $109,072.95 by Postmaster General Aaron V. Brown in 1857 for his postal services, however Chorpening, under protest, believed he deserved more compensation. On July 15, 1870, Congress authorized the Postmaster General to adjust the Chorpenning claim. On December 23, 1870, Grant's Postmaster General John A. J. Creswell ruled that Chorpenning was owed a $443,010.60 adjustment. On January 12, 1871 a House committee suspended payment to Chorpenning. On February 9, 1871 Congress repealed the July 15, 1870 law that allowed the Postmaster General to adjust the Chorpenning claim. On March 3, 1871 Congress forbid that any appropriations go to pay the Chorpenning claim. On May 8, 1872 Congress again forbid any appropriations to pay for the Chorpening claim. Pierrepont ruled that Postmaster General Creswell was not an arbitrator between Chorpenning and Congress. Chorpenning's legal counsel argued that Congress was bound to pay any contracts between Congress and a private citizen. Pierrepont argued citing Gordon v United States that the Postmaster served as in a ministerial position rather than judicial, and therefore Creswell's adjustment was not binding. Pierrepont referred the Chorpening claim to the Court of Collections and allowed the next Congress to decide the fate of the Chorpening claim, unless the statute of limitations stopped the claim.

=== Mississippi (1875) ===
President Grant's Reconstruction policy worked through the U.S. Attorney General and the Justice Department, in addition to the Secretary of War and the War Department. During later Reconstruction white supremacists known as white liners in both the North and the South put pressure on the Grant Administration to limit the use of deployed troops in the South that protected African American citizens under the Reconstruction Act of 1867. Previously President Grant had destroyed the Ku Klux Klan under the Enforcement Acts in 1871. Resistance continued and resurged as white liners violently attacked Mississippi blacks in 1875. Republican Governor Adelbert Ames requested troops to protect black voters. In order to avoid violence, Attorney General Pierrepont sent George K. Chase to Mississippi who met with white liner leaders to hold them to their previous pledge not to use violence during the election. President Grant and Att. Gen. Pierrepont told Governor Ames to use federal troops only if the white liners used violence on election day. No violence took place on election day, however, the intimidation tactics of the white liners prior to the election kept blacks and Republican voters from the polls.

=== Whiskey Ring (1875–1876) ===
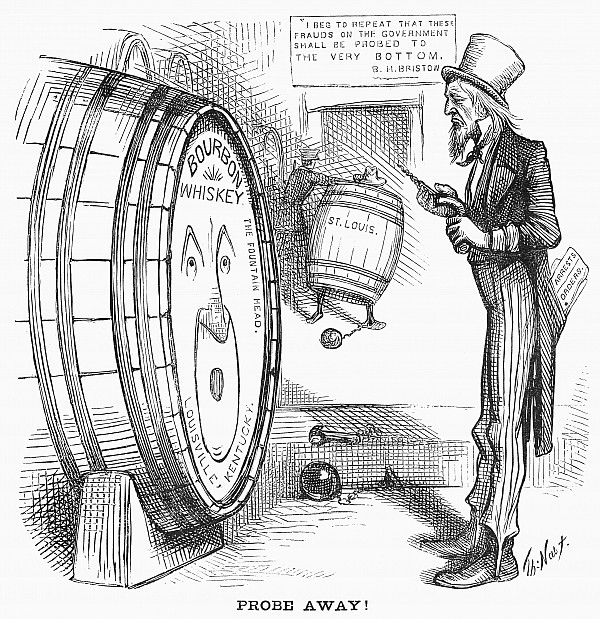
A cartoon that lampooned the Whiskey Ring.

After the American Civil War, whiskey distillers in St. Louis developed a tax evasion ring that depleted the U.S. Treasury. By 1875, the Whiskey Ring had grown into a nationwide criminal syndicate that included whiskey distillers, brokers, and government officials; making enormous profits from the sale of untaxed whiskey. Also rumored, was that in 1872 the Ring had secretly funded the Republican Presidential campaign. In an effort of reform and to clean up corruption, President Ulysses S. Grant appointed Benjamin Bristow, as U.S. Secretary of Treasury in 1874, who immediately discovered millions of dollars were being depleted from the U.S. Treasury. Under orders from President Grant, in May 1875, Sec. Bristow struck hard at the Ring, nationally shutting down distilleries, arresting hundreds involved in the ring having obtained over 350 indictments. The Ring through Bristow's vigorous raids had been effectively shut down. In April 1875, President Grant appointed Pierrepont Attorney General and teamed him up with Bristow to prosecute the Ring and clean up corruption. Pierrepont and the Justice Department created by Grant prosecuted the Whiskey Ring. Under orders from Grant, Pierrepont controversially sent circular letters to district attorneys in Milwaukee, Chicago, and St. Louis denying immunity to offenders who would testify against the ring. Pierrepont's prosecution of the ring however was viewed satisfactory by the public.

During the Summer of 1875, both Bristow and Pierrepont obtained President Grant's order to "let know guilty man escape". During the Fall of 1875, evidence was discovered that Grant's private secretary, Orville Babcock had been involved in the Ring. Bristow and Pierrepont, stayed behind after a cabinet meeting with President Grant and showed him correspondence between Babcock and William Joyce in St. Louis, indicted in the Ring, cryptic telegram messages as evidence of Babcock's involvement in the Ring. Babcock was summoned to the Oval Office for an explanation and was told to send a telegram to bring Wilson to Washington, D.C. After Babcock did not return to the Oval Office, Pierrepont discovered Babcock was in the process of writing a letter warning Wilson to be on his guard. This angered Attorney General Pierrepont, who spilled ink over Babcock's letter and shouted, "You don't want to send your argument; send the fact, and go there and make your explanation. I do not understand it." Babcock was indicted and later acquitted in a trial in St. Louis, after an oral deposition from President Grant defending Babcock was given to the jury. The Justice Department obtained 110 convictions of persons involved in the Whiskey Ring.

In March 1876, a rumor spread throughout Washington, D.C., that Attorney General Pierrepont had given information to aid the defense counsel of Orville Babcock in St. Louis. Pierrepont publicly denied the allegation in a letter to Scott Lord and stated the rumor was "an infamous falsehood". Pierrepont suspected that Gen. Babcock himself was the source of the rumor. Babcock was dismissed as Grant's personal secretary after Babcock's acquittal in St. Louis. Pierrepont also denied the rumor that himself and Secretary Bristow were at odds with each other. Pierrepont produced a letter from October 1875 to Bluford Wilson, Bristow's assistant during the Whiskey Ring raids, that proved Bristow and Pierrepont were working together in harmony during the Whiskey Ring prosecutions.

== U.S. Minister to Britain ==
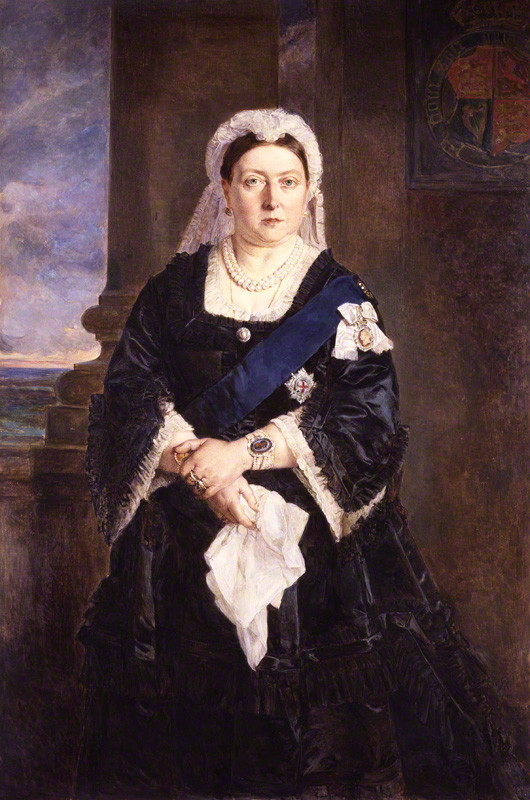
Queen Victoria

On May 22, 1876 President Grant appointed Pierrepont Minister Plenipotentiary of the United States to Britain, having replaced Robert Schenck, serving until December 1, 1877. While serving as minister to Britain, Pierrepont became interested in bimetalism, frequently traveling to France, a bimetalist country.

On June 5, 1877 Pierrepont gave a reception for former President Ulysses S. Grant at his elaborate house on Cavendish Square. The Prince of Wales Edward Albert, Foreign Secretary Lord Derby Edward Stanley, William Gladstone and his wife Catherine, and American journalist Kate Field attended the formal affair. Although Grant was well received by the British public, a diplomatic controversy was caused when British officials including Prime Minister Benjamin Disraeli told Pierrepont that as a former head of state, Grant was nothing more than a "commoner", and could not be recognized by the government. Lord Derby, minister of foreign affairs, told Pierrepont that since Grant had no formal rank in the United States, he had none in Britain. Pierrepont countered Derby saying that first Napoleon had been elected ruler, not by hereditary lineage, and yet the succeeding Bonaparte emperors were recognized by England: "Once an Emperor always an Emperor." Therefore, the same precedent applied to an elected head of state: "Once a President always a President." Grant's diplomatic recognition, although informal, came when Queen Victoria invited him to Windsor Castle. The Grants accepted, and on June 26, 1877 Pierrepont introduced the former president to the Queen. She received them in an appropriate setting, the castle's magnificent 520 feet quadrangle.

After his tenure as Minister Plenipotentiary ended, Pierrepont returned to the United States and resumed his private legal practice in New York.

== Retirement ==
=== Transcontinental trip to Alaska ===
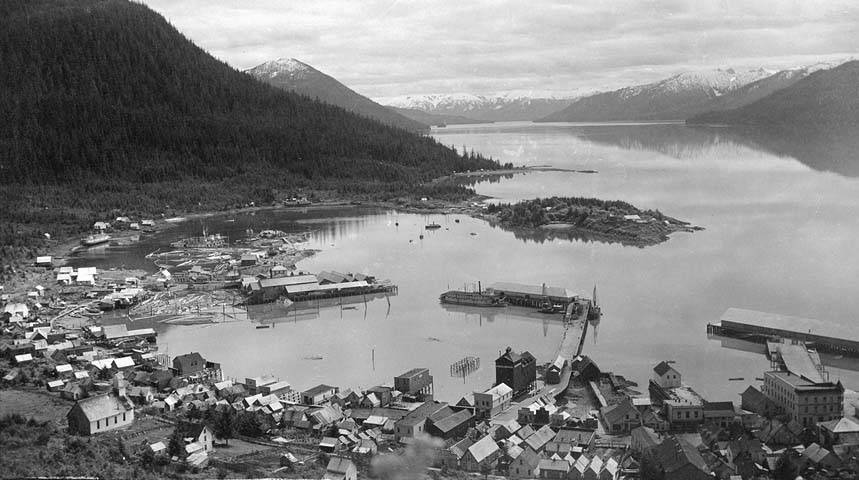
Wrangell Harbor, Alaska 1897

In 1883, at the age of 66, Pierrepont and his son Edwin Willoughby Pierrepont took a transcontinental trip to the far reaches of Alaska starting from New York. On July 25 Pierrepont and Edwin visited Fort Wrangell, having sailed by ship into Wrangell Harbor. Edwin was impressed by the mirror reflection of the snow-capped mountains in the harbor waters. Upon their return, Pierrepont and Edwin published a widespread paper titled, "Fifth Avenue to Alaska" in 1884. Edwin was awarded a fellowship to the Royal Geographical Society of England. The long trip took a health toll on him and he died in 1885.

=== Visited Atlanta ===
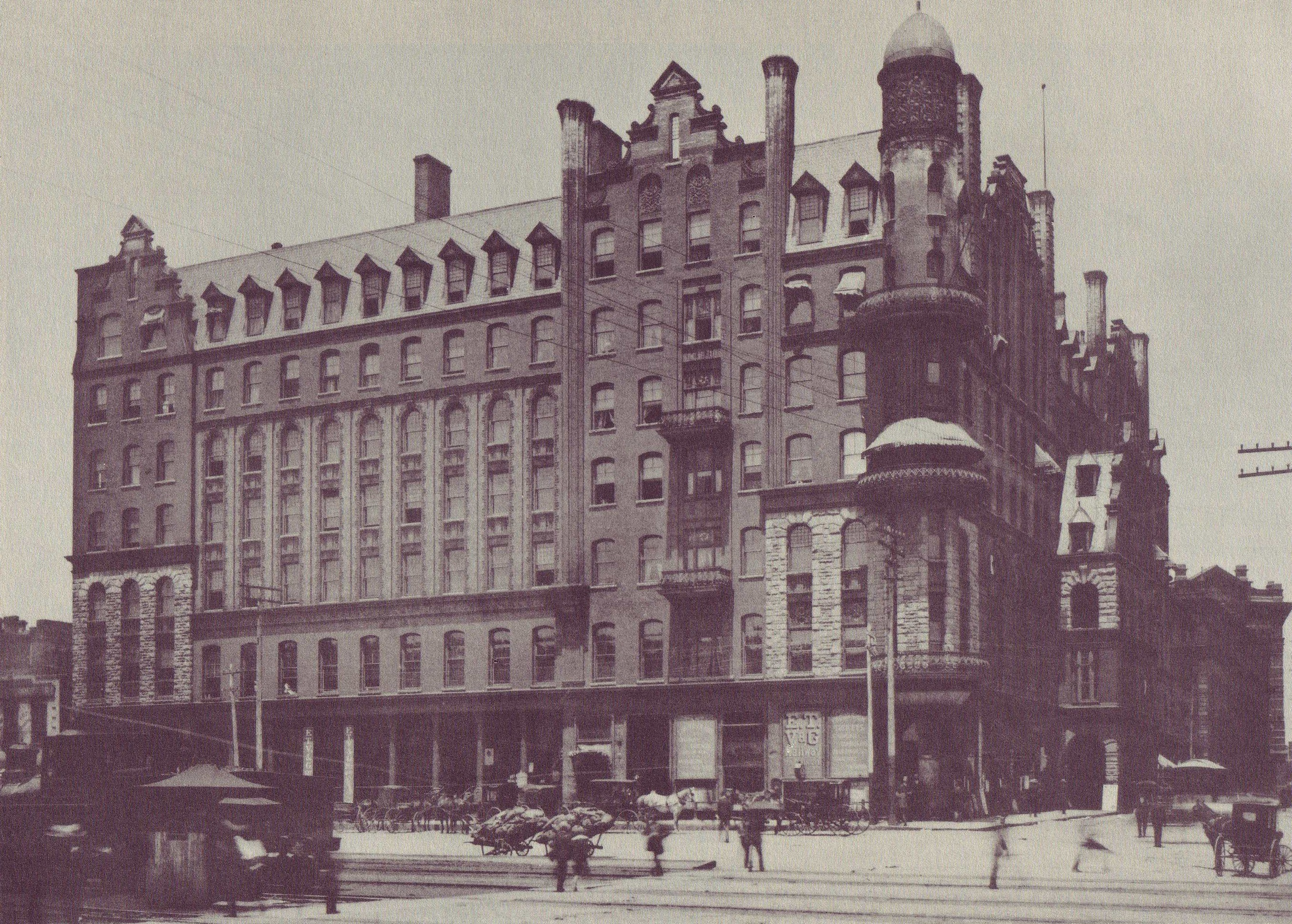
Kimball House 1890

On August 28, 1886, Pierrepont and his wife visited Atlanta, Georgia, staying at the Kimball House. The year before Pierrepont had submitted a letter published by The Atlanta Constitution on bimetalism, a topic of popular discussion during the 1880s. Pierrepont favored a bimetalist economy believing that having two metal currencies would alleviate poverty and would keep a few wealthy businessmen from monopolizing a single gold standard currency. While in Atlanta, Pierrepont stated that the relations between the North and the South had improved and that the Southerners bore no ill will to the North. Pierrepont believed Atlanta was a model city for Southern industrialization. The Pierreponts toured the South in search of a place to improve Margaretta's health condition. Mrs. Pierrepont had suffered from grief after the death of their son Edwin, who had died of a fever in Rome in 1885.

== Illness, death, and funeral ==
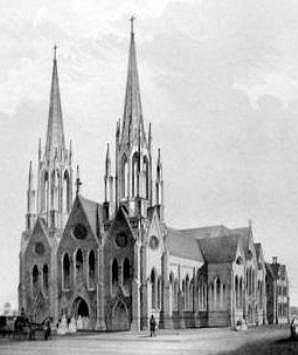
Pierrepont's funeral service was held at the gothic cathedral, Calvary Church, on March 9, 1892.

According to The New York Times, in late 1889, Pierrepont suffered a nervous disease that "deprived him of the use of his limbs". Although Pierrepont was an invalid, for the next two and one-half years he was able to carry on most of his law practice and travel back and forth from his New York residence to his mansion in Garrison. On Wednesday, March 2, 1892, at the age of 74, Pierrepont suffered a massive stroke that paralyzed the right side of his body and he lost the ability to speak. Four days later on March 6, two days after his 75th birthday, Pierrepont died in the house in New York he had built 40 years earlier.

The funeral services were done by Rev. Dr. Henry Y. Satterlee at Calvary Church on Wednesday March 9, at 10 am. Pierrepont's body was transferred to Garrison where he was buried at Saint Philip's Church Cemetery, accompanied by 10 prominent pallbearers.

== Legacy ==
Pierrepont is primarily known for his success as an attorney appearing for well-known clients in important cases, and for fighting political corruption in federal, state, and city offices. This includes his successful prosecution and shutting down the Whiskey Ring, a national tax evasion syndicate, from 1875 to 1876. Politically, Pierrepont's success relied mainly on his appointments to office by President Ulysses S. Grant to U.S. Attorney for New York, U.S. Attorney General, and U.S. Minister to Great Britain. Pierrepont is also known for his publications of pamphlets on financial questions, mainly supporting bimetallic standard of U.S. currency. Although Pierrepont's tenure as Attorney General took place during Reconstruction, his primary interest at the Justice Department was ruling on cases that determined the rights of U.S. citizens abroad. Certain Supreme Court rulings against the Enforcement Acts signed into law by President Grant, hampered Pierrepont's enforcement of civil rights in the United States.

== Sources ==
=== Books ===
- Brands, H. W. (2012). The Man Who Saved the Union: Ulysses S. Grant in War and Peace. New York: Doubleday. ISBN 978-0-385-53241-9.
- McFeely, William S. (1974). Woodward C. Vann (ed.). Responses of the Presidents to Charges of Misconduct. New York, New York: Delacorte Press. pp. 133–162. ISBN 0-440-05923-2.
- McFeely, William S. (1981). Grant: A Biography. Norton. ISBN 0-393-01372-3.
- Smith, Edward Conrad (1934). Dumas Malone (ed.). Dictionary of American Biography Pierrepont, Edwards. New York: Charles Scribner's Sons.
- Smith, Jean Edward (2001). Grant. New York: Simon & Schuster. ISBN 0-684-84927-5.
- White, Ronald C. (2016). American Ulysses: A Life of Ulysses S. Grant. Random House Publishing Group. ISBN 978-1-5883-6992-5.

=== Internet ===
- "Edwards Pierrepont". Washington D.C.: The United States Department of Justice. November 4, 2014.

Legal offices
| Preceded by George H. Williams | U.S. Attorney General; Served under: Ulysses S. Grant; April 26, 1875 – May 21, 1876 | Succeeded by Alphonso Taft |
Diplomatic posts
| Preceded by Robert C. Schenck | U.S. Minister to Great Britain; 1876–1877 | Succeeded by John Welsh |
