= Ware's Department Store =

Historic building

Coordinates: 40°54′28″N 73°46′59″W

Ware's Department Store is a historic building located in the city of New Rochelle in Westchester County, New York and is significant for both architectural and commercial reasons. Ware's was Westchester's first and, for many years, largest department store, and was prominently located on New Rochelle's fashionable Main Street. The store operated from 1881 to the late 1930s, when the property was sold to the retailer Bloomingdale's to serve as their first suburban department store location. Not only was Ware's a key place in New Rochelle during its 20th-century boom years, its founder and owner, Howard R. Ware was a leading figure in the rapidly growing community as well. Ware first moved to New Rochelle from Massachusetts at the age of 13 and began to work as a clerk. In 1881 he became partner in the firm of Ware & Sheffield, which eventually became a stock company in 1913. Mr. Ware was a director and vice president of the National City Bank of New Rochelle, a founder and first president of the local Y.M.C.A. from 1899 to 1916, and an active member of St. John's Methodist Episcopal Church. He retired from his active business in 1932.

The large building was erected in 1914 at 550 Main Street on the site of the George Ferguson Company Building. The five story, 100,000 square foot building drew shoppers from around the area, first as Ware's Department Store and then, starting in 1947, as a free-standing Bloomingdales. The original Ware's was destroyed by fire in 1913.

After sitting vacant for 25 years it reopened in 2004 as a newly renovated residential building home to 72 luxury live-work lofts. Touting high-tech units with downtown New Rochelle views, as well as the vintage charm that comes with Art Deco etchings and hardwood floors that date back to its Bloomingdale's days, the building is poised to attract tenants wanting to be part of the downtown New Rochelle's revitalization.

== See also ==
- New Rochelle Historic Sites
