= New Rochelle Trust Building =

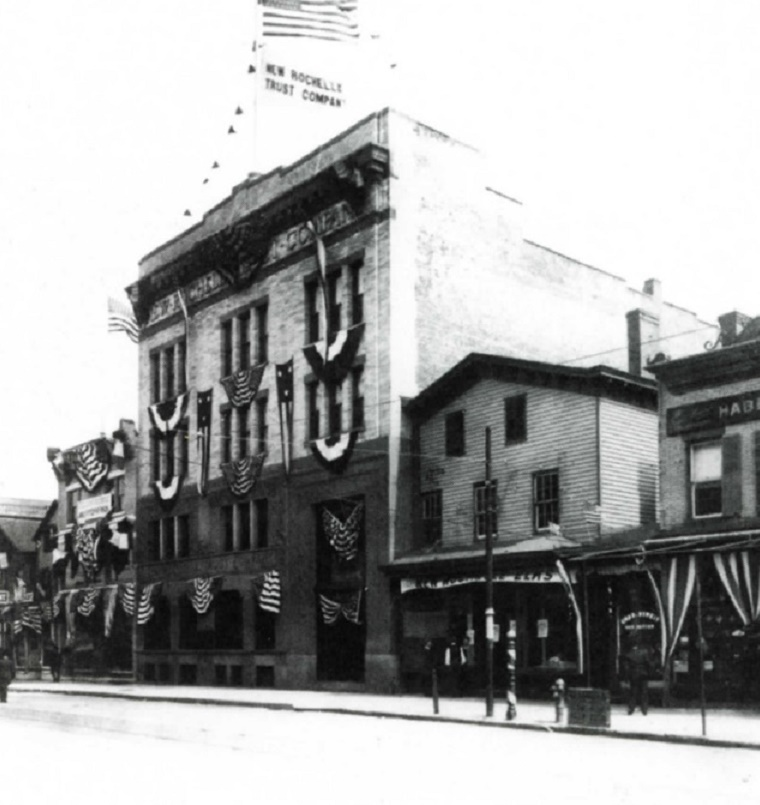
- Interactive map of the New Rochelle Trust Building area

General information
- Type: Office
- Architectural style: Richardsonian Romanesque
- Location: 542 Main Street, New Rochelle, New York, United States
- Coordinates: 40.90782°N 73.78294°W
- Completed: 1893
- Renovated: 1908

Technical details
- Floor count: 5

Design and construction
- Architect: F.C. Merry
- Main contractor: Hoggson Brothers, New York

New Rochelle Trust Company Building is a historic building located in the city of New Rochelle in Westchester County, New York. The building is significant in its association with banking, as the work of architect F. C. Merry, and as an important part of the overall streetscape of the Main Street business district.

The New Rochelle Trust Company began on Central Avenue in 1888 as the 'Bank of New Rochelle' and moved to the 542 Main Street site in 1893. When the firm first opened its doors, during the heyday of private banks in the days prior to national banking laws, it was the only public banking facility in the area. Architecture critic Montgomery Schuyler, writing in the Architectural Record in 1909, described the building as a "spoiled piece of architecture" claiming that the addition of the upper stories was an adventure in commercialism which resulted in "about the most depressing erection on Main Street of New Rochelle". Others differed in their opinion, noting that the building was completely fireproof, and was remodeled using quality materials such as brownstone, marble and Roman Brick on the exterior and marble and bronze on the interior.

The building reflects two distinct periods of construction; the original two-story building dates from the 1880s and is four bays in width, and built in brownstone with a curvilinear foliated Sullivanesque ornament. The 1908 remodeling of the building resulted in the creation of a new entrance bay made from brownstone, as well as the construction of two additional stories of office space faced in buff-colored brick. The resulting upper facade of the building is three bays in width, capped by a cornice beneath a parapet gable with a shallow pediment.

In 2008, the Preservation League of New York State selected the New Rochelle Business Improvement District “Model Development Block” to receive its prestigious 'Excellence in Historic Preservation Award' in recognition of its superior restoration of a number of historic Main Street properties including the Trust Building. As part of the restoration, a large ornamental canopy which was not original to the building was removed to highlight the ornate brownstone work which had been hidden. The building was also once home to a glass company, and the ornamental stained glass window above the building’s entrance was also protected by the renovation.

== See also ==
- New Rochelle Historic Sites
