= Hurst-Pierrepont Estate =

Historic house in New York, United States

- U.S. National Register of Historic Places
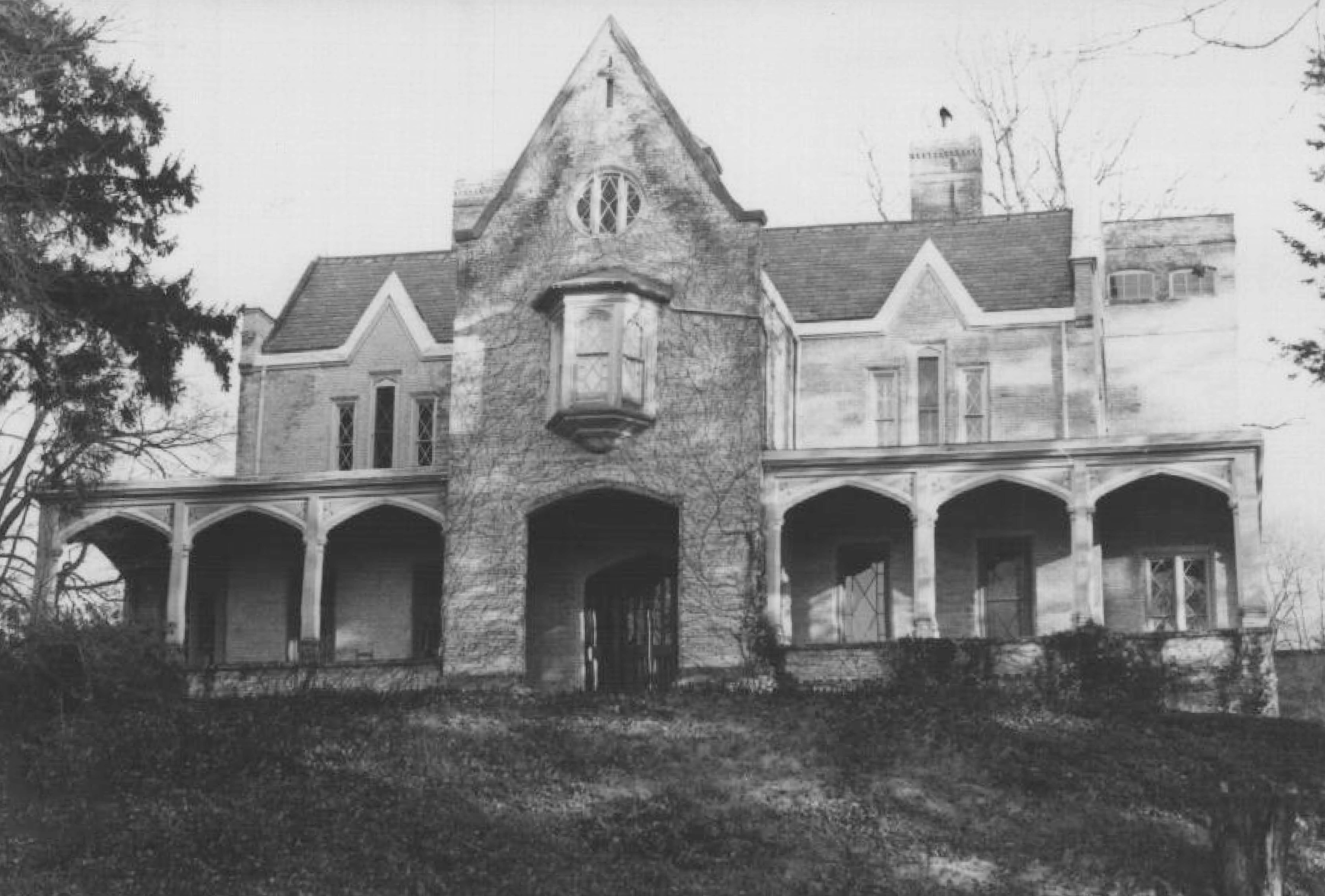

- Location within New York Location within the United States
- Location: NY 9-D, Garrison, New York
- Coordinates: 41°22′45″N 73°56′19″W
- Area: 15.8 acres (6.4 ha)
- Built: 1867
- Architect: Alexander Jackson Davis
- Architectural style: Gothic Revival
- MPS: Hudson Highlands MRA
- NRHP reference No.: 82001247
- Added to NRHP: November 23, 1982

Hurst-Pierrepont Estate is a historic estate located at Garrison in Putnam County, New York. It was designed by architect Alexander Jackson Davis (1803-1892) for Edwards Pierrepont (1817-1892) and built in 1867. It is a two-story brick Gothic villa. It features a four-story, flat roofed tower. Also on the property is a cow barn and carriage house.

It was listed on the National Register of Historic Places in 1982.
