= Standard Star Building =

Building in New Rochelle, New York

Coordinates: 40°54′40.9″N 73°46′54.4″W

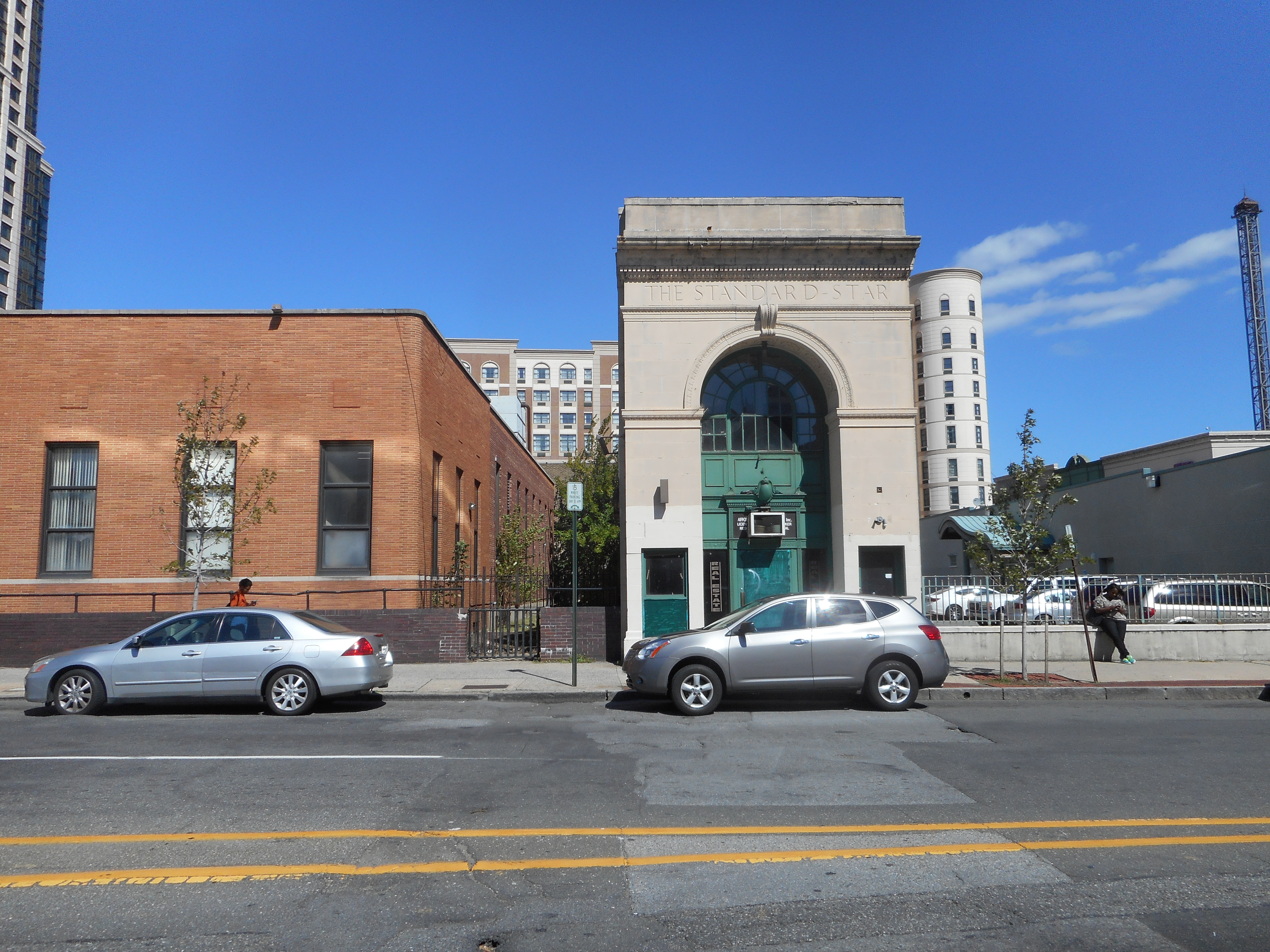

The Standard Star Building is a historic commercial structure located in the Downtown section of New Rochelle, Westchester County, New York. The building, designed by architect Lawrence J. Barnard, was completed in 1924 and is an architecturally significant example of the Italian Renaissance style in New Rochelle. Although it has been altered, these changes occurred only on the Le Count Place façade and the interior of the building. The original Standard Star building exterior remains largely unchanged. It is further historically significant for its association with a long-published New Rochelle newspaper covering life in New Rochelle.

== History ==
The Standard Star building was built in 1924 and designed by Lawrence L. Barnard and built by George Watson. Barnard is a familiar name in New Rochelle, but few references to his history or work were found; he appears to have been a partner in Barnard and Wilder who designed New Rochelle’s Fire Station No 3 in 1912, also in the Italian Renaissance Style.

The Standard-Star was founded in 1923 and first published on July 2 of that year with the merging of New Rochelle’s two prior daily papers, The Standard and The Star. Its first publisher was T. Harold Forbes. Forbes, the son of George M. Forbes, also a newspaper publisher, was a vaudeville actor and dancer who appeared with George M. Cohan in several productions. The Standard-Star ceased publication in 1998, with its subscribers and goodwill transferred to Gannett's Westchester Journal News as part of a consolidation of nine other papers in the Lower Hudson Valley.

== Architectural detail ==
The building rests on a polished granite foundation with a cast stone finish. The windows and transoms are of a cast metal with a green bronze finish. The central entry’s design creates the appearance of a double-height arched doorway. The round arched entry is classically decorated and all of the trim and decoration is of cast metal.

The formal entry led to the main business area and is flanked by un-ornamented, symmetrical openings. That to the south was designed as an entry to the upper story offices; the corresponding window to the north initially housed an illuminated bulletin board that provided the news of the day. The north side of the building is articulated as a series of arched openings at both stories designed to flood the work spaces with natural light.

The original Standard Star Building has been altered and added to over the course of the twentieth century. Building data cards for the property indicate additions and alterations were made to the building in 1931 and 1946. More alterations are logged from 1949, 1966, 1968, and 1978. The last date was perhaps the most significant, when an addition was built off the rear of the building (facing the Le Count Place side of the lot) to house a restaurant and bar. In 2001, the restaurant was converted into a nightclub.

== See also ==
- New Rochelle Historic Sites
