= Pioneer Building (New Rochelle, New York) =

Historic commercial building in New York, United States

- U.S. National Register of Historic Places
- New York State Register of Historic Places
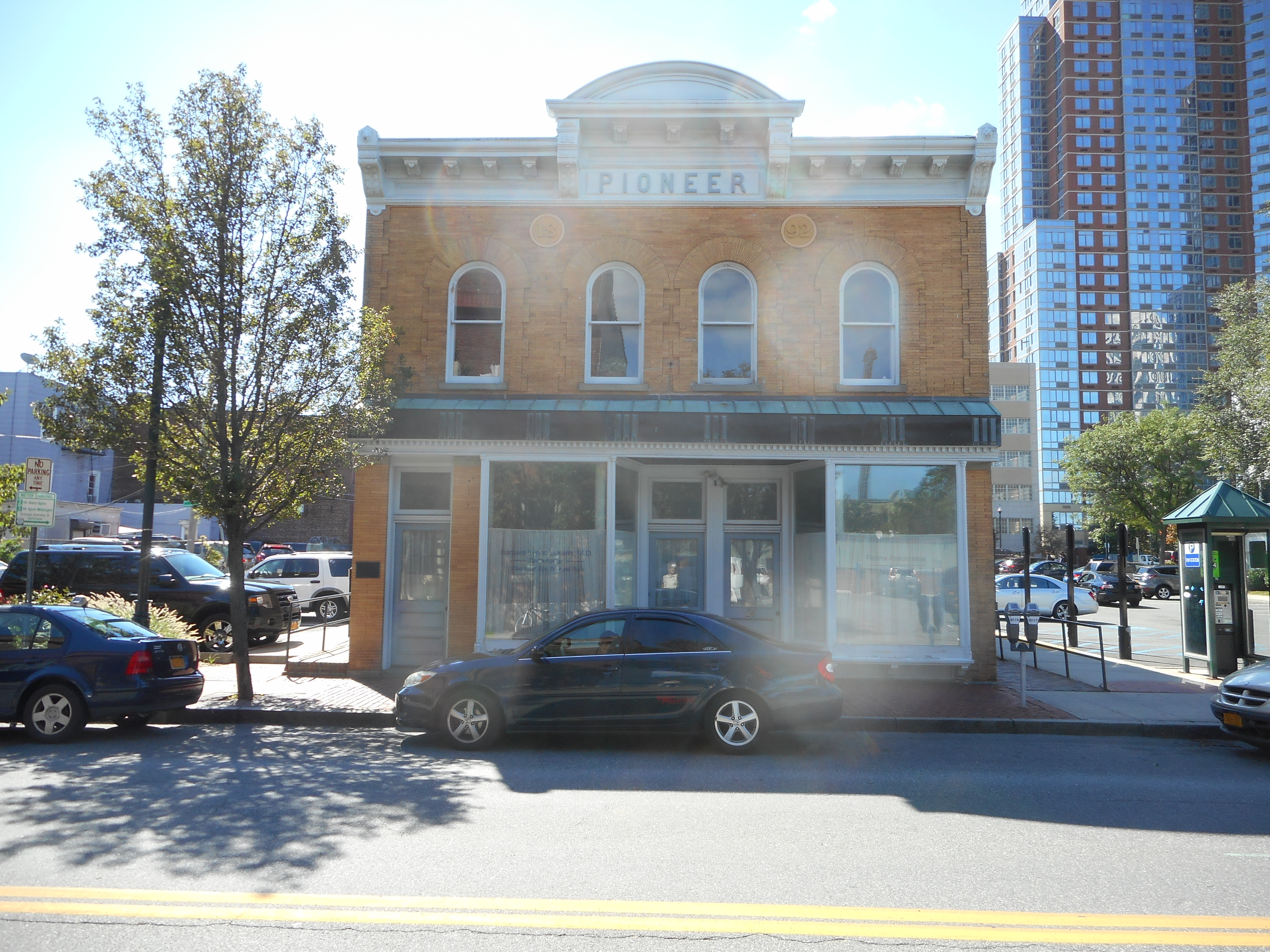
- The building as seen from across Lawton Street

- Location within New York Location within the United States
- Location: 14 Lawton Street, New Rochelle, New York
- Coordinates: 40°54′36″N 73°46′56″W
- Area: less than one acre
- Built: 1892
- Architect: John New & Son
- Architectural style: Italianate
- NRHP reference No.: 83004217
- NYSRHP No.: 11942.000656

Significant dates
- Added to NRHP: December 29, 1983
- Designated NYSRHP: November 23, 1983

The Pioneer Building is a late nineteenth-century commercial/office structure located on Lawton Street in the Downtown business district of the City of New Rochelle in Westchester County, New York. The building is a good example of Neo-Italian Renaissance commercial style and represents an important aspect in the late nineteenth and early twentieth century history of New Rochelle. John New & Son, the New Rochelle builder responsible for its construction, is credited with its design.

The Pioneer Building is considered significant, partly because other historic buildings that once surrounded it have been demolished and replaced by newer construction. It was added to the Westchester County Inventory of Historic Places on January 5, 1988, to the New York State Register of Historic Places on November 23, 1983, and to the National Register of Historic Places on December 29, 1983.

== History ==
In 1892 Henry Sweet, editor and publisher of the New Rochelle Pioneer, felt that the newspaper' deserved a home of its own. The Pioneer had been founded in 1860 by an exiled Irish writer named William Dyott. Originally one of several of New Rochelle's weeklies, it had grown and prospered enough by 1885 to become the community's first daily. It had always been published in rented offices, however, and sweet decided to erect a new building on Lawton Street to serve as its headquarters. The paper was published in the building until 1920 when it was forced to close due to increasing competition. From that point onward, the building held a variety of tenants but generally declined. Lawton Street, between Huguenot and Main Streets, was a fully occupied block of commercial buildings through much of the 20th Century. In the 1970s, much of the block was leveled to make way for the New Rochelle Public Library. The Pioneer building remained, but in isolation, no longer related to its former setting. In the late 1970s, the building was vacant and was considered a candidate for demolition. Sylvia Schur acquired the building from the city of New Rochelle to house her business, Creative Food Services, and undertook an extensive restoration project that was completed in 1981.

== Architecture ==
The two-story, four-bay building, is set on a long and narrow rectangular lot, surrounded by parking lots on three sides. It was never intended to stand alone, but rather, to be part of a streetscape of similar structures. Consequently its side walls are plain, and only the front facade has any true detail or ornament. The front façade is decorated in the Italianate style, covered in a high quality buff-colored iron spot Roman brick. There are two cornices, one of copper and the other of metal with the 'Pioneer' name set in bold relief. The first floor is composed of two storefronts with central entryways each flanked by large bay windows.

The unadorned side elevations are covered with painted brick, with a trompe-l'oeil mural painted on the west side. A separate entrance along the building's east side provides access to the second floor. The rear of the building drops down to one story. Two chimneys project from the west side roof. The most intact sections of the building's interior are found in the two first floor storefronts and east side entrance hall. These areas retain original finishes, door and window trim, some wood wainscoting, and decorated pressed-metal ceilings.
