= Wildcliff =

Historic house in New York, United States

- U.S. National Register of Historic Places
- New York State Register of Historic Places
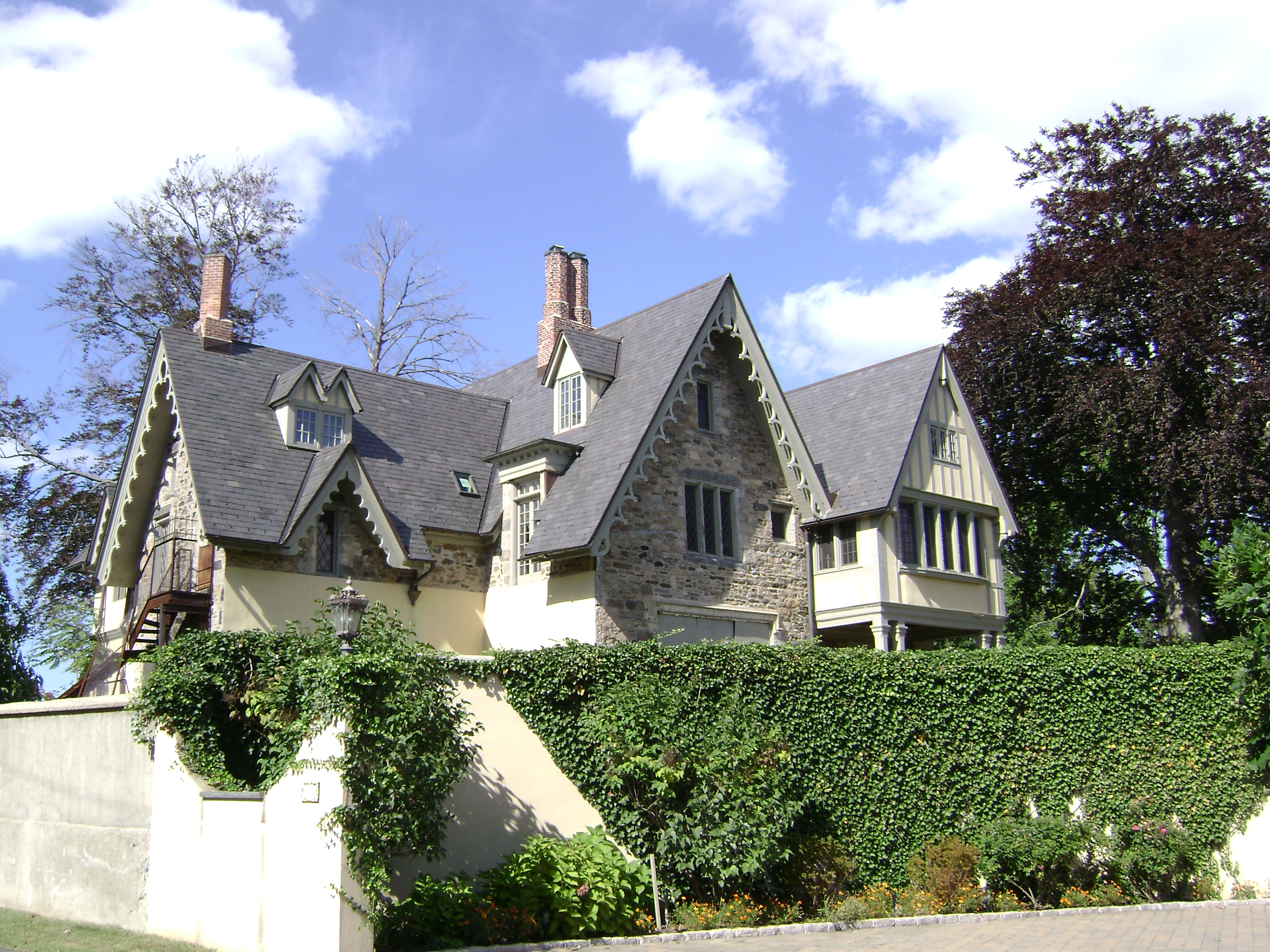
- Wildcliff in 2014
- Location: 42 Wildcliff Road, New Rochelle, New York
- Coordinates: 40°54′23″N 73°46′12″W
- Built: 1852
- Architect: Alexander Jackson Davis
- Architectural style: Gothic Revival, Tudor Revival
- NRHP reference No.: 02001656
- NYSRHP No.: 11942.000884

Significant dates
- Added to NRHP: December 31, 2002
- Designated NYSRHP: October 25, 2002

Wildcliff, also referred to as the Cyrus Lawton House, was a historic residence overlooking Long Island Sound in New Rochelle in Westchester County, New York. This 20-room cottage-villa, built in about 1852, was designed by prominent architect Alexander Jackson Davis in the Gothic Revival style. The home was added to the National Register of Historic Places on December 31, 2002.

The unoccupied mansion was destroyed by a suspicious fire on the evening of November 26, 2018. The house was a total loss. On December 12, 2018, four 13-year old, middle school boys (all local, New Rochelle residents) were arrested and charged in connection with the fire. All were charged as juveniles with misdemeanor third-degree criminal trespass, while one faces a felony charge of fourth-degree arson.

The Wildcliff Mansion after a three-alarm fire destroyed it. Image taken on November 27th, 2018.

== Overview ==
Designed in 1852 by Alexander Jackson Davis, one of the preeminent American architects of the nineteenth century, the house was sited to take full advantage of the dramatic views of the water. Davis’ original plan envisioned the family sitting on the villa's front porch and looking out over the spectacular scenery. The beauty of the house and its site were accented by the progression of the entry drive. The visitor originally entered the property from the north along a private road. The curving drive ascended toward the house, proceeding toward Echo Bay and curving around to the front door. The family who first commissioned the design was one Cyrus Lawton, a close friend of Mr. Davis. Mrs. Lawton was a member of the prominent Davenport family, for whom the entire area is named, and the house was a wedding gift to the couple.

Wildcliff was erected in the early 1850s, during a period when New Rochelle was beginning its transformation from a rural farming community into a residential suburb. Improvements in transportation permitted affluent families to build homes in New Rochelle and commute to work in nearby New York City. The land along the scenic north shore of Long Island Sound was especially sought after and many of Davis' designs were built here. His smaller homes were called "cottages", and the more substantial ones "villas", however the terms were frequently combined. Among their typical features were prominent, steep-roofed gables, with elaborately carved bargeboards under their eaves. Wildcliff is one of two "cottage-villas" built by Davis on New Rochelle's waterfront peninsula, Davenport Neck, the other being "Sans Souci" (or Davenport House).

After Cyrus Lawton's death in 1902, the property was inherited by his son Newberry Lawton Davenport. It was later purchased by Julius and Clara Prince who moved into the home in 1914. Clara Prince donated Wildcliff to the City of New Rochelle in 1940 with the hopes that it would be used as a natural science museum. Clara Prince's obituary, "Mrs. Julius Prince", The New York Times, September 14, 1941, page 49, notes that she was a "philanthropist who had given generously to educational projects" and that she was especially known for the donation of Wildcliff to New Rochelle in 1940, ten years after the city had tried in vain to purchase the property. It has since been used for a variety of purposes including a youth museum and performing arts center. Around 1970 a wing housing a theater was added at one corner of the house but the main structure remains intact.

Since late 2010, the local organization Jen's Community at Wildcliff has been working with the City of New Rochelle and its citizens to bring awareness to the building and to create a preschool and education center.

== Architecture ==
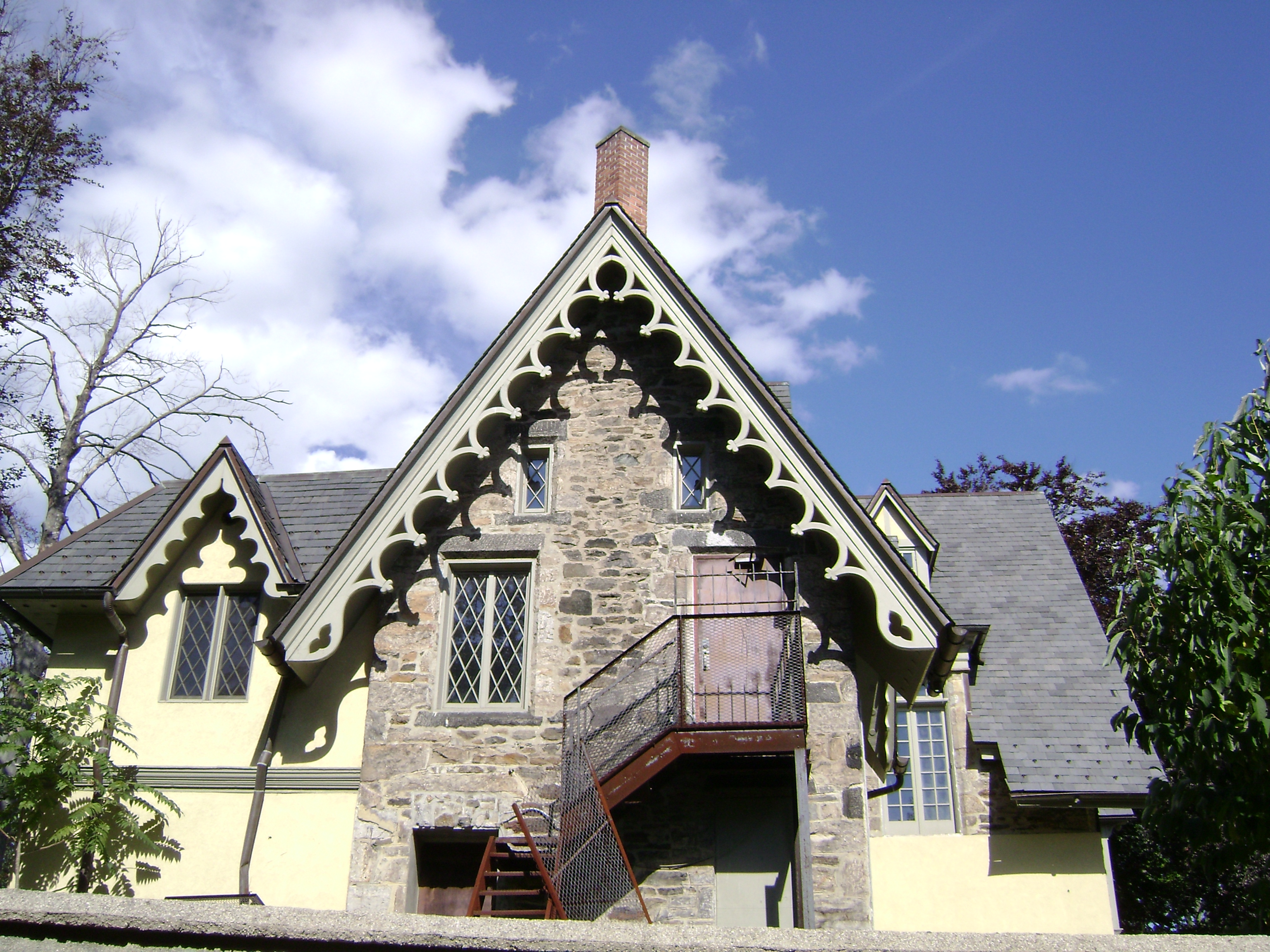
detail

Wildcliff is a 2 1/2-story house faced primarily in rubblestone of various colors. These stones give the picturesque design a natural quality, as if the building were rising out of the landscape. For a house in the Northeast, Downing prescribed a design with high roofs, thick walls, warm rooms, and chimneys. The original front facade of the building was on the southern portion of the present house facing Long Island Sound, now partially obscured by the out-of-character one story addition used as a theater. This facade originally had a 2 1/2-story central gable with a pair of windows on the first story looking out over the water. In the mid-1860s, Davis designed additions to the house in the same style with special efforts made so that the changes would be as inconspicuous as possible. Bargeboards and other ornamental details match exactly and stonework was laid so that there would be no sign of the joint between the old and new sections.

Later owners Julius and Clara Prince were responsible for the second major expansion to the home which was done in the half-timbered Tudor style. The additions consisted of the construction of a porte-cochere, a new entrance on the south facade of the home, and the conversion of the original entrance into a long, twelve-part window.

The original plan of the house can still be read on the interior. To the south is the original library and entrance hall, now combined into one space. On the upper floors are bedrooms with steeply sloping walls reflecting their locations within the gables. The attic retains some original floorboards and four paneled doors with original knobs. The interior retains much of its historic plan and some historic fittings, but much of the interior detail has been lost.
