= Alexander Jackson Davis =

American architect (1803–1892)

- Detail of Davis portrait ca. 1855
- Born: July 24, 1803; New York City, U.S.
- Died: January 14, 1892 (aged 88); Llewellyn Park, West Orange, New Jersey, U.S.
- Occupation: Architect
- Practice: 1828–1884
- Buildings: North Carolina State Capitol; U.S. Customs House; Dutch Reformed Church; Lyndhurst; Wadsworth Atheneum; Loudoun; Grace Hill; Hurst-Pierrepont
- Projects: Montgomery Place; Oliver Bronson House; Virginia Military Institute; Llewellyn Park; Lather's Woods

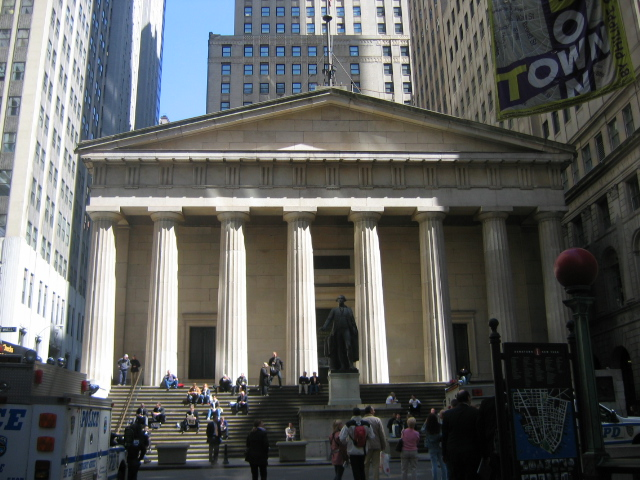
Federal Hall National Memorial, New York City

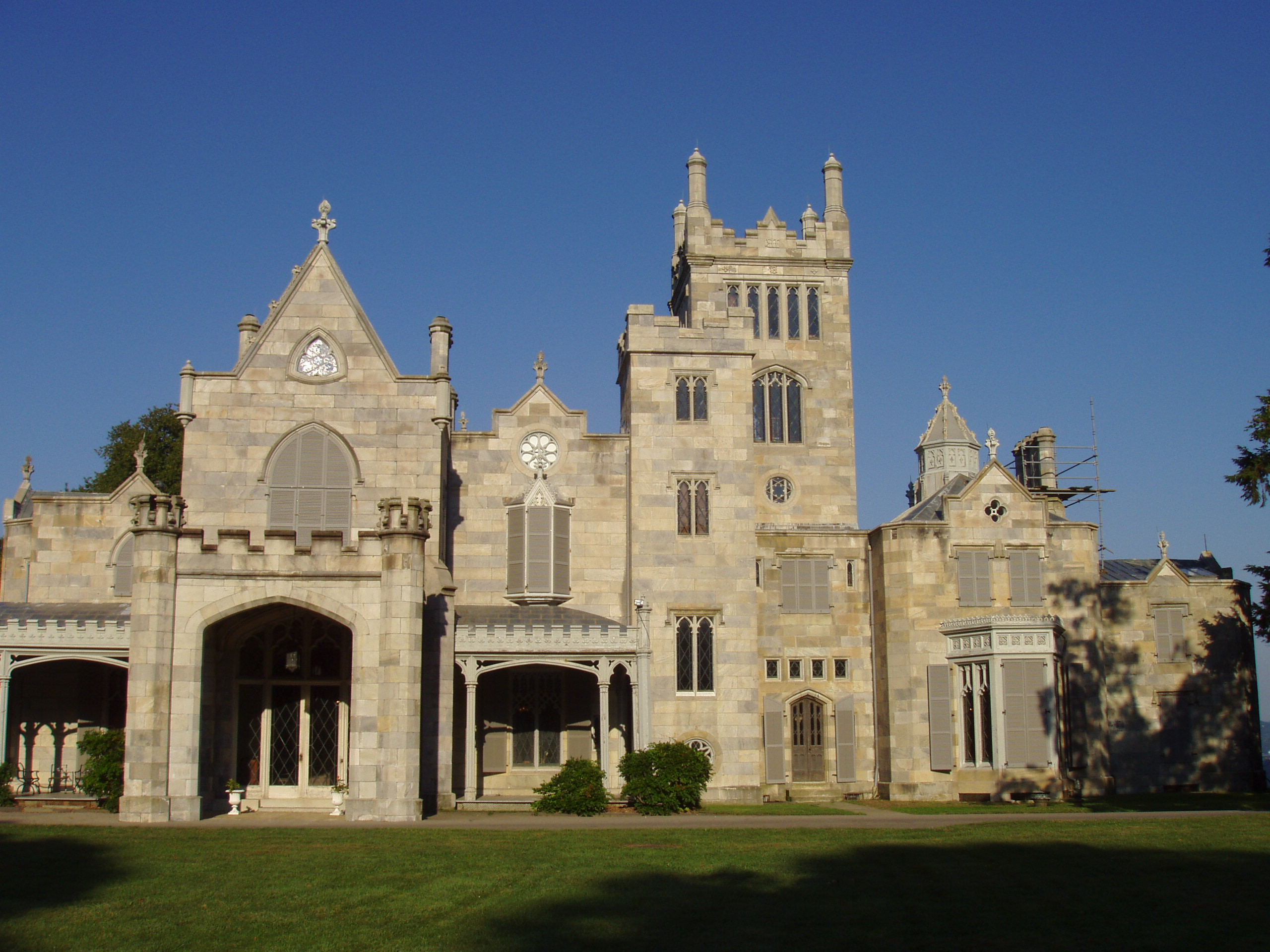
Front facade of Lyndhurst, 1838 and 1864

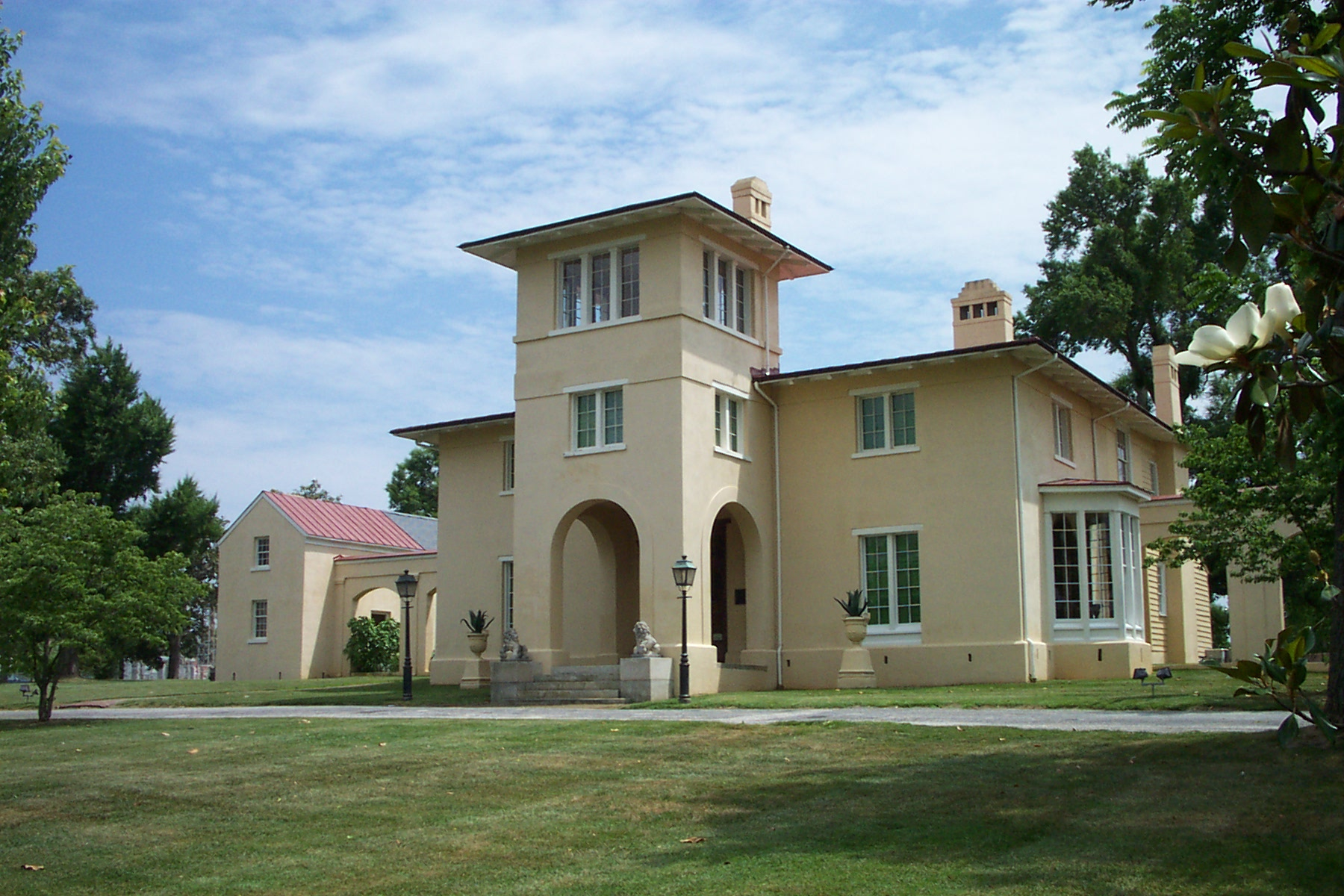
Blandwood Mansion is an example of Italianate design by Davis. 1844 in Greensboro, North Carolina

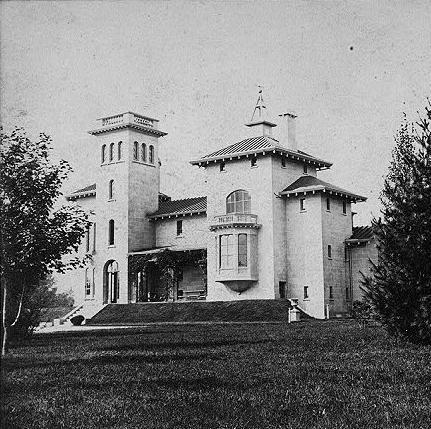
Davis's Italianate villa “Winyah Park" in New Rochelle, New York (photo 1909)

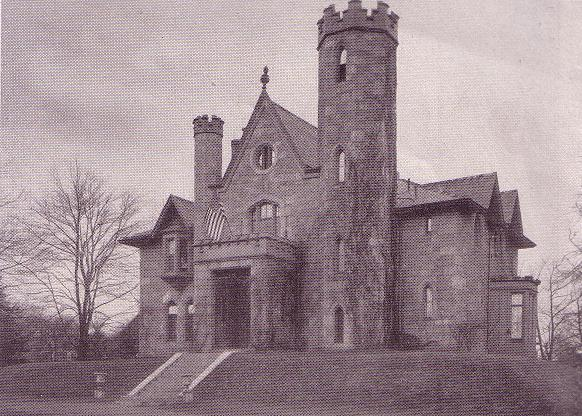
”Tudor Villa" in New Rochelle, New York (photo 1909)

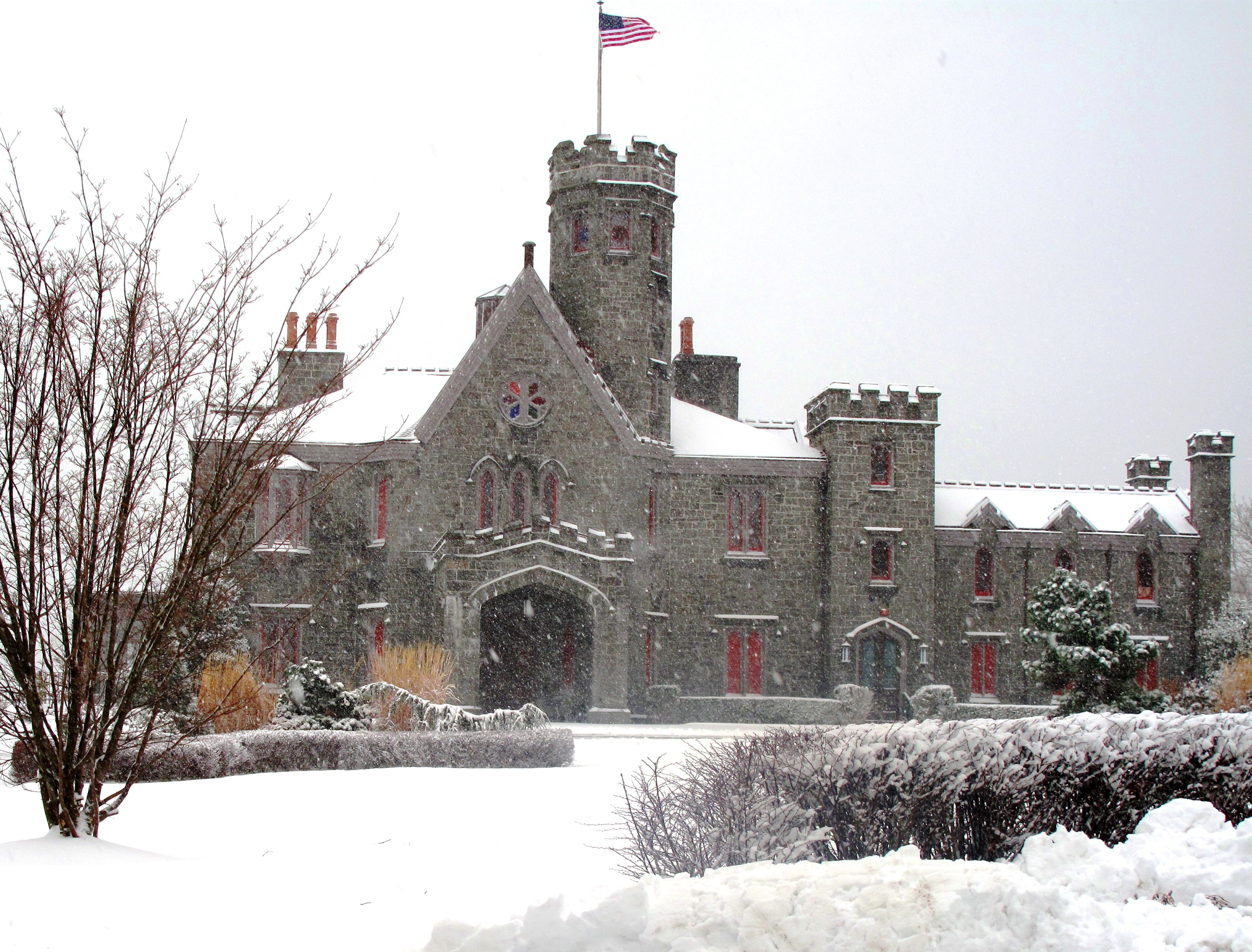
Whitby Castle in winter (photo 2010)

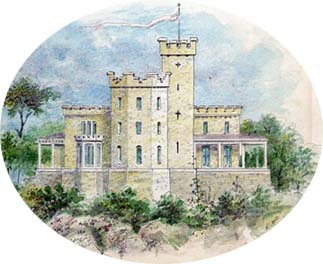
Gothic villa, watercolor. A faculty residence on the Parade Ground, Virginia Military Institute, 1850s

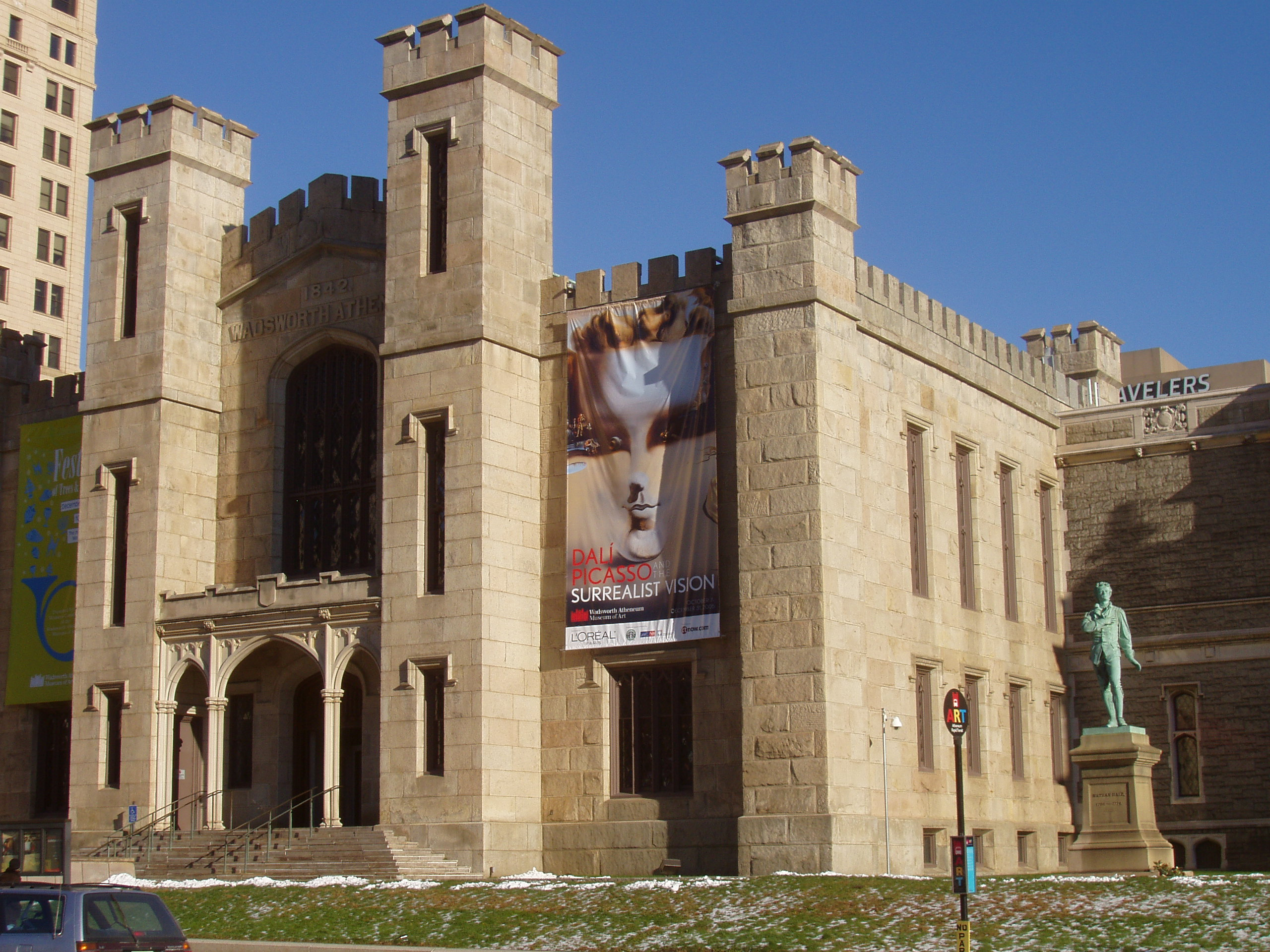
Wadsworth Atheneum, Hartford, Connecticut, 1842

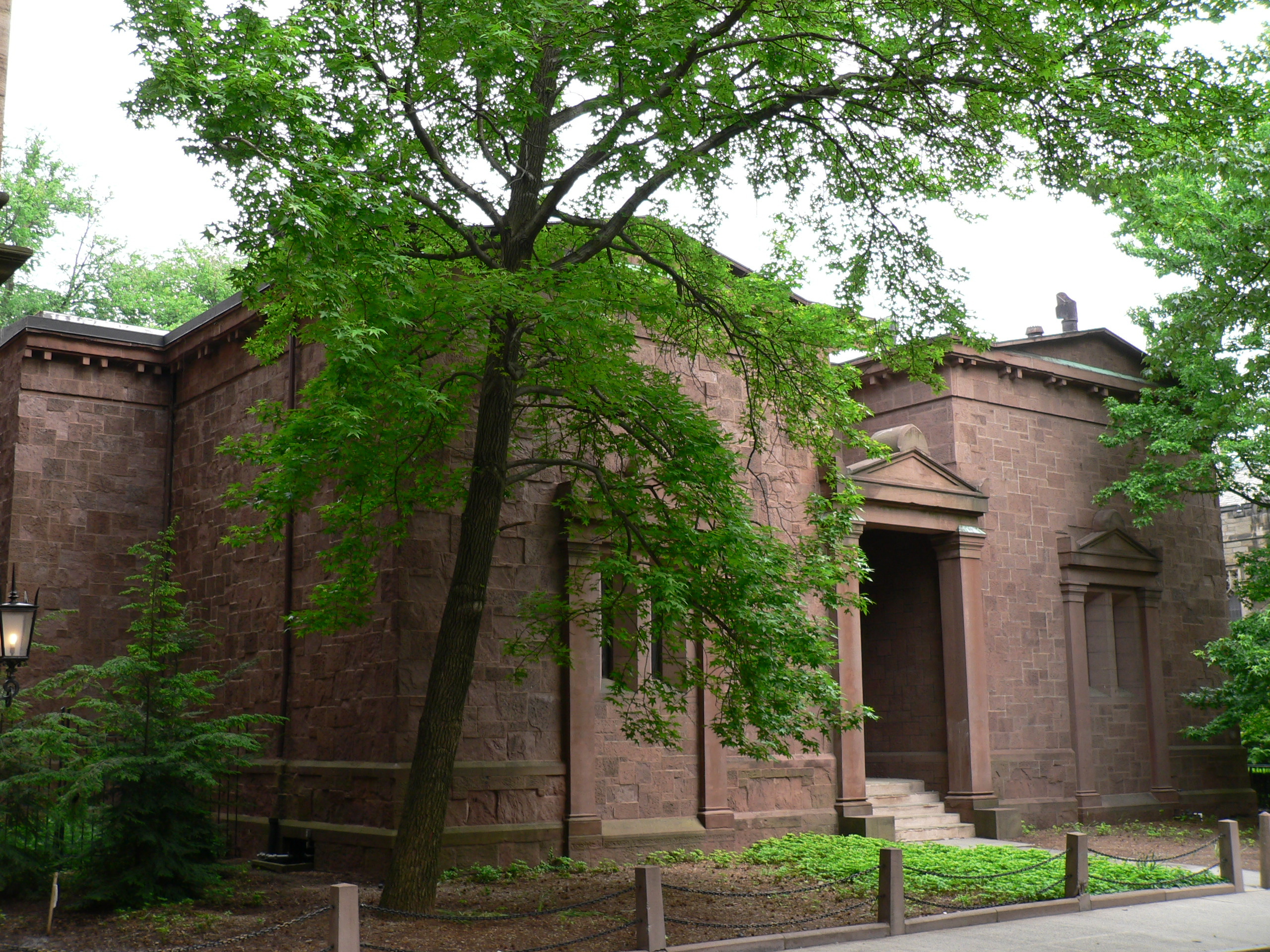
Yale College Secret Society Skull & Bones, attribution either A. J. Davis or Henry Austin (1804–1891)

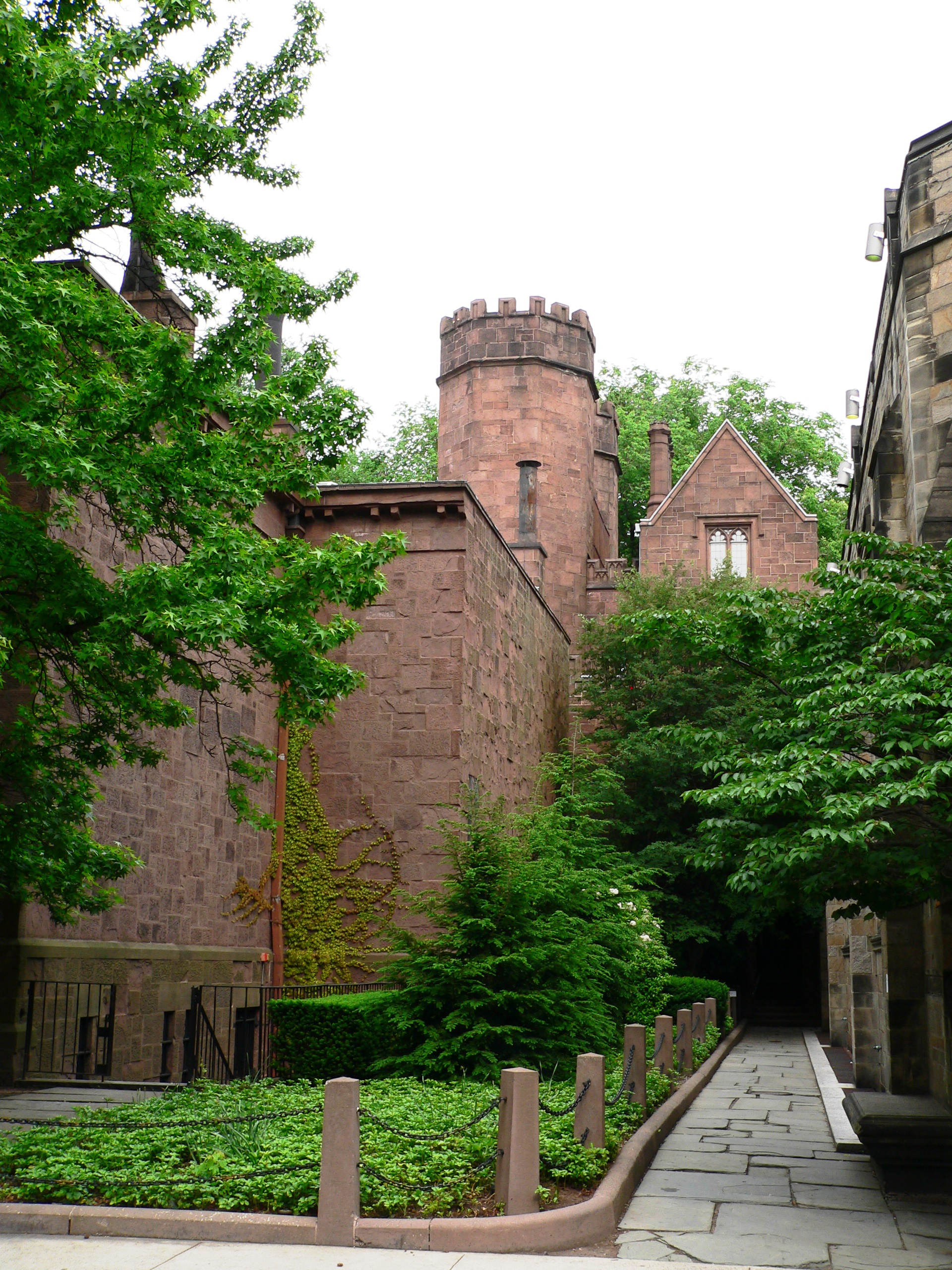
Yale Skull & Bones' tomb showing A. J. Davis' towers salvaged from his Yale Alumni Hall (1851–1853) at right rear

Alexander Jackson Davis (July 24, 1803 – January 14, 1892) was an American architect known particularly for his association with the Gothic Revival style.

== Education ==
Davis was born in New York City and studied at the American Academy of Fine Arts, the New-York Drawing Association, and from the antique casts of the National Academy of Design. Dropping out of school, he became a lithographer and from 1826 he worked as a draftsman for Josiah R. Brady, a New York architect who was an early exponent of the Gothic Revival style. Brady's Gothic 1824 St. Luke's Episcopal Church is the oldest surviving structure in Rochester, New York.

== Career ==
=== Partnership with Ithiel Town ===
Davis made a first independent career as an architectural illustrator in the 1820s, but his friends, especially painter John Trumbull, convinced him to turn his hand to designing buildings. Picturesque siting, massing and contrasts remained essential to his work, even when he was building in a Classical style. In 1826, Davis began working in the office of Ithiel Town and Martin E. Thompson, the most prestigious architectural firm of the Greek Revival. In the office Davis had access to the best architectural library in the country, in a congenial atmosphere where he gained a thorough grounding. They designed Sachem's Wood in New Haven, Connecticut, which was built from 1820 to 1830.

From 1829, in partnership with Town, Davis formed the first recognizably modern architectural office and designed many late Classical buildings, including some of public prominence. In Washington, Davis designed the Executive Department offices and with Robert Mills the first Patent Office building (1834–1836). He also designed the Custom House of New York City (1833–1842). Bridgeport City Hall, constructed in 1853 and 1854, is a later government building Davis designed in the Classical style.

A series of consultations over state capitols followed, none apparently built entirely as Davis planned: the Indiana State House, Indianapolis (1831–1835), elicited calls for his advice and designs in building other state capitols in the 1830s: North Carolina's (1833–1840, with local architect David Paton), the Illinois State Capitol, often attributed entirely to the Springfield, Illinois architect John F. Rague, who was at work on the Iowa State Capitol at the same time, and in 1839, the committee responsible for commissioning a design for the Ohio Statehouse asked his advice. The resulting capitol in Columbus, Ohio, often attributed to the Hudson River School painter Thomas Cole consulting with Davis and Ithiel Town, has a stark Greek Doric order colonnade across a recessed entrance, flanked by recessed window bays that continue the rhythm of the central portico, all under a unique drum capped by a low saucer dome. With Town's partner James Dakin, he designed the noble colossal Corinthian order of the Greek Revival "Colonnade Row" on New York's Lafayette Street, the very first apartments designed for the prosperous American middle class (1833, half still standing). Two years after its completion, Davis was hired to design the Dutch Reformed Church upriver in Newburgh, inspired by the Temple of Poseidon, both positioned for the viewing of maritime travelers. He continued in partnership with Town until shortly before Town's death in 1844.

In 1831, he was elected an associate member of the National Academy. From 1835, Davis began work on his only publication, Rural Residences, the first pattern book for picturesque residences in a domesticated Gothic Revival style, which could be executed in carpentry, and also containing the first of the Italianate style "Tuscan" villas, flat-roofed with wide overhanging eaves and picturesque corner towers. Unfortunately, the Panic of 1837 cut short his plans for a series of like volumes, but Davis soon formed a partnership with Andrew Jackson Downing, illustrating his widely read books.

Additions to Vesper Cliff were built in 1834.

=== Country residences (1840 - 1860) ===
The 1840s and 1850s were Davis's two most fruitful decades as a designer of country houses. His villa "Lyndhurst" at Tarrytown, New York, is his most famous house. Many of his villas were built in the scenic Hudson River Valley—where his style informed the vernacular Hudson River Bracketed that gave Edith Wharton a title for a novel—but Davis sent plans and specifications to clients as far afield as Indiana. Around 1850, he designed Sharswood Plantation for the Virginian planter Nathaniel Crenshaw Miller. He designed Blandwood, the 1846 home of Governor John Motley Morehead that stands as America's earliest Italianate Tuscan Villa. Innovative interior features, including his designs for mantels and sideboards, were also widely imitated in the trade. Other influential interior details include pocket shutters at windows, bay windows, and mirrored surfaces to reflect natural light. The Greek Revival style William Walsh House was built at Albany, New York, and Gothic Revival style Belmead was built near Powhatan, Virginia, in 1845.

Two smaller but well known structures designed by Davis include one built for John Cox Stevens in 1845; Stevens was the first Commodore of the New York Yacht Club and the small Carpenter Gothic building on his property near Hoboken was given to NYYC to be used as its first clubhouse. This building, fondly called "Station 10", still exists and can be found in Newport. Davis built a similar pavilion for his colleague and fellow NYYC founder, John Clarkson Jay, on Jay's Long Island Sound waterfront property in Rye, New York, in 1849. Although this building was taken down in the 1950s, the original setting and garden where it was once located is part of a National Historic Landmark site and open to the public.

Inspired in part by friend Andrew Jackson Downing, Davis constructed several Gothic Revival cottage-style homes in Central New York, including the 1852-completed Reuel E. Smith House, which is included in the National Register of Historic Places.

In 1851, Davis completed Winyah Park, one of approximately eighteen or more Italianate houses he designed in the 1850s. Winyah was built for Richard Lathers, who had studied architecture with Davis in New York in the 1830s. It was situated on Lathers's estate in the town of New Rochelle in Westchester County, New York. For this design Davis won the first architectural prize at the New York World's Fair of 1853–1854. He used its most striking feature, two adjacent yet contrasting towers, in a much larger house named Grace Hill, built in Brooklyn between 1853 and 1854. In both Winyah and Grace Hill, broad octagonal towers serve as visual anchors for the taller square towers. Lathers later employed Davis to design four additional "investment houses" on his property which became known as "Lathers's Hill". The homes included two Gothic cottages and "Tudor Villa" constructed in 1858, and "Pointed Villa" constructed in 1859. In 1890, the artist Frederic Remington purchased one of these cottages from which he created his estate "Endion", which served as the studio for most of his artistic career.

The success of "Winyah Park" and "Lathers's Hill" generated other important commissions for Davis in New Rochelle, including two cottage-villas, Wildcliff and Sans Souci, which he designed for members of a prominent Davenport family. Both homes feature Davis's signature central gable. Another extant Gothic Revival commission is Whitby Castle, designed in 1852 for Davis' lifelong friend William Chapman. The building is part of the Boston Post Road Historic District (Rye, New York) and retains many original features. Today it is used as the clubhouse for the Rye Golf Club.

Davis was invited to become a member of the American Institute of Architects shortly after its founding in 1857. In the late 1850s, Davis worked with the entrepreneur Llewellyn S. Haskell to create Llewellyn Park in West Orange, New Jersey, a garden suburb that was one of the first planned residential communities in the United States.

Davis designed buildings for the University of Michigan in 1838, and in the 1840s he designed buildings for the University of North Carolina at Chapel Hill. At the Virginia Military Institute, Jackson's designs from 1848 through the 1850s created the first entirely Gothic Revival college campus, built in brick and stuccoed to imitate stone. Davis's plan for the Barracks quadrangle was interrupted by the Civil War; it was sympathetically completed to designs of Bertram Goodhue in the early 20th century.

Davis is credited with coining the term "Collegiate Gothic", documented in a handwritten description of his own "English Collegiate Gothic Mansion" of 1853 for the Harrals of Bridgeport, Connecticut.

He married Margaret Beale in 1853 and had two children.

=== Declining patronage and retirement (1860–1892) ===
With the onset of Civil War in 1861, patronage in house building dried up, and after the war, new styles unsympathetic to Davis's nature were in vogue. In 1867, he designed the Hurst-Pierrepont Estate. In 1878, Davis closed his office. He built little in the last thirty years of his life, but spent his easy retirement in West Orange drawing plans for grandiose schemes that he never expected to build, and selecting and ordering his designs and papers, by which he was determined to be remembered. They are shared by four New York institutions: the Avery Architectural and Fine Arts Library at Columbia University, the New York Public Library, the New-York Historical Society, and the Metropolitan Museum of Art. A further collection of Davis material has been assembled at the Winterthur Museum, Garden and Library. Davis is interred in Bloomfield Cemetery in Bloomfield, New Jersey.

== Selected works ==
- Belmead, Powhatan, Virginia (1845)
- Blandwood, Greensboro, North Carolina (1846)
- Bridgeport City Hall, Bridgeport, Connecticut (1853–1854)
- Davenport House, New Rochelle, New York (1859)
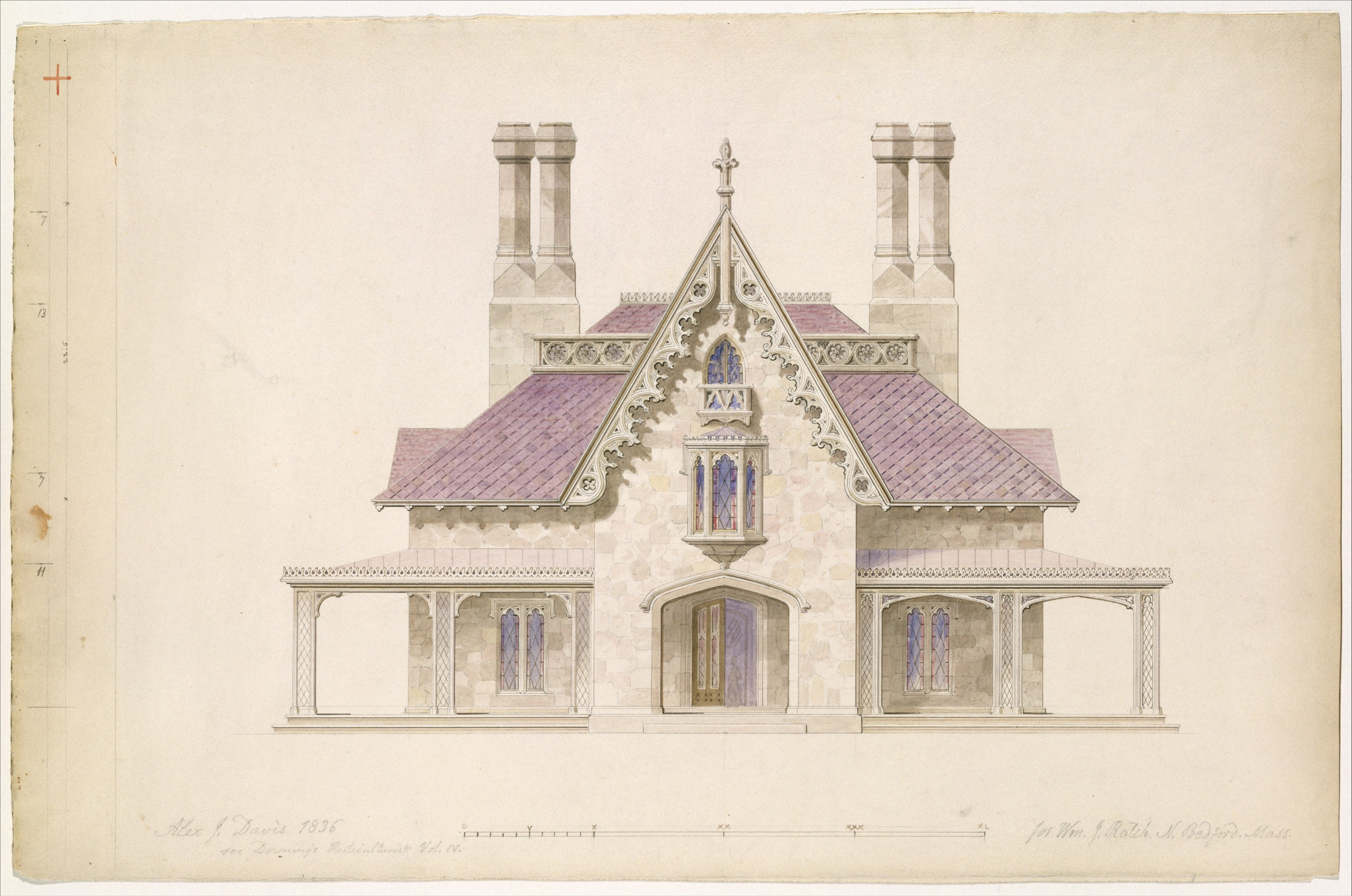
- House for William J. Rotch, New Bedford, Massachusetts (front elevation) 1845. The Reuel E. Smith house (1852) is similar to this plan.
  Litchfield Villa, Brooklyn, New York (1857)
- Lyndhurst, Tarrytown, New York (1838)
- Reuel E. Smith House, Skaneateles, New York (1852)
- Wadsworth Atheneum, Hartford, Connecticut (1842)
- Wildcliff, New Rochelle, New York (1852)
- Winyah Park, New Rochelle, New York (1851)

== See also ==
- John Henry Devereux, South Carolina architect who shared a client with Alexander Jackson Davis
