= Davenport House (New Rochelle, New York) =

Historic house in New York, United States

- U.S. National Register of Historic Places
- New York State Register of Historic Places
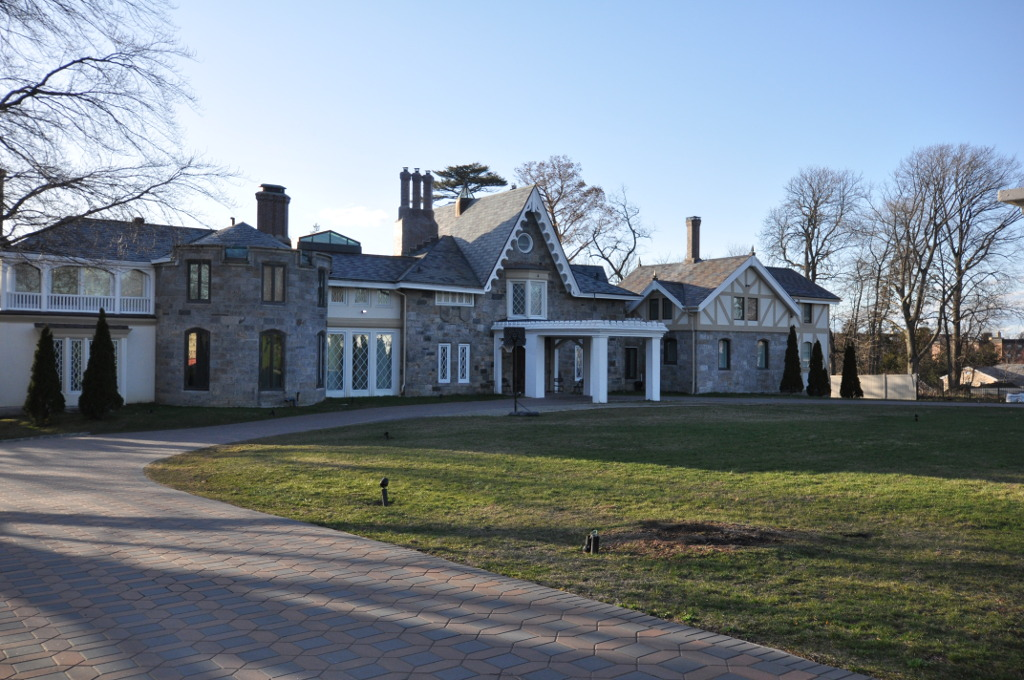
- Davenport House in 2018

- Location within New York Location within the United States Location within New York City
- Location: 157 Davenport Road, New Rochelle, New York
- Coordinates: 40°54′5″N 73°46′17″W
- Built: 1859 (167 years ago), with later additions
- Architect: A. J. Davis; Frederick H. Coles; Smelling and Potter; Parish & Schroeder
- Architectural style: Gothic Revival
- NRHP reference No.: 80002791
- NYSRHP No.: 11942.000005

Significant dates
- Added to NRHP: April 30, 1980
- Designated NYSRHP: June 23, 1980

The Davenport House, also known as Sans-Souci, is an 1859 residence in New Rochelle, New York, designed by architect Alexander Jackson Davis in the Gothic Revival style. The "architecturally significant cottage and its compatible architect-designed additions represent a rare assemblage of mid-19th through early 20th century American residential design". The house was listed on the National Register of Historic Places in 1980.

== Setting ==
The home is located in a residential section of New Rochelle, a suburb just north of New York City. The sprawling 11,216-square-foot (1,042.0 m^{2}), 39 room house is one of the largest in the area and is deeply set back from Davenport Road. The house's original setting included several undeveloped acres. Today, upper-middle and upper-class, single-family detached housing surrounds the property on all four sides. The property boasts mature trees, numerous bushes, a large front lawn, a circular driveway and stone entrance pillars, with wrought-iron fence and gates.

== History ==
The cottage was built in 1859 for Lawrence Montgomery Davenport whose great-grandfather had purchased the extensive Sound shore property known today as Davenport Neck. At the time of its construction in 1858, only a handful of dwellings were located on the promontory including several owned by Davenport's close relatives. With a commanding view of Long Island Sound, meadows, and groves of fruit trees, the property was ideally situated for Davis' scenic sense. The original 1 1/2-story blue-stone cottage features a large center gable, bargeboards, symmetrical chimneys, decorative shields, and diamond-paned oculi windows.

Mrs. Anthony Walton White Evans purchased the home in 1865, and in 1871 hired Davis to design a one-story wing on the south side of the house. The addition included a library, semi-circular billiard room and conservatory. In 1875, the family hired architect Frederick Coles to add a similar wing on the north side. Shortly after, a second story was added to both the north and south wing adding numerous bedrooms and bathrooms to both. In 1912 the north wing was further expanded and includes the large kitchen, pantry, a small dining room, and second stairwell.

The home remained in the Evans family until 1922 when its next owner, Leroy Frantz, transformed the first floor of the southern wing into a ballroom.

== Design ==
All rooms in the building have "intricately designed parquet floors". The main entrance hall has an open staircase, molded cornices, and a red marble fireplace. The semi-circular library has a wood-panelled ceiling, a fireplace and bookcases. The former billiard room has molded cornices, dado, and sliding interior shutters. The parlor and dining room have molded cornices, glazed sliding doors, and red marble fireplaces. Some of the other rooms have fireplaces and the semi-circular master bedroom has a sleeping porch.

The interiors of the house and its period additions are largely unchanged. Original A. J. Davis details are abundant and include crenelated cornices in the parlor and dining room, original marble mantelpieces and decorative corbels in two second-floor bedrooms.

== See also ==
- Lispenard-Rodman-Davenport House, historic 18th century residence also on Davenport Neck

== Bibliography ==
- Downing, Andrew Jackson. The Architecture of Country Houses. New York: Dover Publications, Inc., 1969.
- Sanchis, Frank E. American Architecture: Westchester County, New York. North River Press, Inc., 1977.
- Scharf, John T. History of Westchester County. Philadelphia: L. E. Preston and Company, 1886.
- Vaux, Calvert. Villas and Cottages. New York: Dover Publications, Inc., 1970.
- Withey, Henry F. and Elsie R. Biographical Dictionary of American Architects. Los Angeles: Hennessey and Ingalls, Inc., 1970.
