= List of people from New Rochelle, New York =

This list includes notable people who were born in New Rochelle, New York, or lived there for a significant period of time.

- Frank Abagnale, security consultant and former confidence trickster, check forger, and impostor
- Herbert Agar, journalist
- Tony Aiello, CBS television reporter
- Horace M. Albright, conservationist
- James P. Allaire, credited with developing marine steam engine
- Robert Allen, pianist, songwriter ("Chances Are", "There's No Place Like Home for the Holidays")
- Dick Ambrose, actor
- Harold Anderson, illustrator
- Susan B. Anthony, suffragist
- Lee Archer, WWII fighter pilot; one of the first African-American CEOs of a Fortune 500 company
- Bernard Arnault, LVMH chairman
- Jesse Arnelle, basketball player
- Gerry Baker, soccer player
- Faith Baldwin, author
- Marc Ian Barasch, author
- Phil Barnhart, politician
- Nathan Franklin Barrett, landscape architect
- Edward A. Batchelor, sportswriter
- Reynolds Beal, artist
- Anthony C. Beilenson, California legislator
- Francis Rufus Bellamy, writer and editor
- Dick Berg, screenwriter; film and television producer
- Phil Berger, politician
- Derek Bermel, composer, clarinetist, conductor
- Thomas V. Bermingham, Jesuit priest; classics professor and advisor for The Exorcist
- Arnold Bernstein, owner of several shipping lines
- Virginia Berresford, printmaker; artist
- Elizabeth Berridge, actress
- Helen Ginger Berrigan, federal judge
- Lipman Bers, mathematician
- Anthony Bevilacqua, Roman Catholic cardinal
- James Biber, architect
- Walter Biggs, illustrator
- Jerry Bilik, composer
- Stanley Bing, magazine writer
- Ken Blanchard, author, management expert
- Anthony Lispenard Bleecker, banker
- Scotty Bloch, actress
- Jerry Bock, composer (Fiddler on the Roof)
- Mark Bomback, screenwriter
- Benjamin Bonneville, 19th-century fur trader
- Nicholas Bonneville, 19th-century bookseller
- Agnes Booth, actress
- Connie Booth, writer and actress
- Franklin Booth, artist noted for pen-and-ink illustrations
- Gloria Borger, CNN and CBS special correspondent
- David Borowich, financier, philanthropist, community activist
- Rudy Boschwitz, former U.S. senator
- Carrie Bowman, actress
- Peter Bowman, politician
- Samuel S. Bowne, 19th-century U.S. representative
- Peter V. Brett, writer of fantasy novels
- Teresa Brewer, pop and jazz singer, lived on Pinebrook Boulevard
- Clare Briggs, early 20th-century comic strip artist
- Nell Brinkley, illustrator, "Queen of Comics"
- Ron Bruder, billionaire businessman
- Edson Buddle, soccer player
- John Bunny, actor
- Olivia Ward Bush-Banks, writer
- CL Smooth, rapper
- Joey Calderazzo, jazz pianist
- Daryl Campbell, politician, Democratic member of the Florida House of Representatives since 2022
- Joseph Campbell, mythologist, professor and author
- Thomas Carmody, lawyer and politician
- Craig Carton, radio personality, Boomer and Carton in the Morning
- Irene Castle, ballroom dancer
- Montague Castle (1867–1939), Canadian-born American stained glass artist, painter, and business person
- Vernon Castle, ballroom dancer
- Carrie Chapman Catt, women's suffragist
- Frank Tolles Chamberlin, artist
- Riley Chamberlin, actor
- Kenneth Chenault, CEO of American Express, lives in the city
- Penny Chenery, bred and raced Secretariat
- George Randolph Chester, author of Five Thousand an Hour
- Kay Christopher, actress
- Howard Chandler Christy, illustrator
- Graham Clarke, musician, songwriter
- Gene Colan, comic book artist
- Willie Colón, singer, musician, activist, producer
- Bob Coltman, singer, musician
- Peter Conrad, sociologist
- Thomas Cooke, soccer player, participant in the 1904 Olympics
- James Fenimore Cooper, author
- J. Fred Coots, songwriter ("Santa Claus is Coming to Town")
- Maurice Copeland, actor
- Dean Cornwell, artist
- Bud Cort, actor
- Johnny Counts, football player
- Richard Courant, mathematician
- Glenn Cowan (1952–2004), table tennis player
- Judy Crichton, television producer
- Robert Crichton, novelist
- Caresse Crosby, actress
- Otho Cushing, artist
- Faith Daniels, television journalist
- Miriam Davenport, artist
- Thaddeus Davids, colonial businessman
- Irwin D. Davidson, politician
- Billy Davis, songwriter ("Lonely Teardrops"; "Buy the World a Coke")
- Guy Davis, musician
- Ossie Davis, actor, playwright and social reformer, husband of Ruby Dee, lived in Rochelle Heights
- Drew S. Days, III, solicitor general of the United States, professor of Law at Yale Law School
- Alfred Dellentash (born 1948), drug smuggler and band manager
- Jane Emmet de Glehn, figure and portrait painter
- René-Thierry Magon de la Villehuchet, financier
- Peter DeRose, songwriter (Deep Purple)
- Dan DeCarlo, cartoonist who developed Josie and the Pussycats and Archie Comics
- Ruby Dee, actress, poet, playwright, screenwriter, journalist, and activist; married to Ossie Davis, lived in Rochelle Heights
- Bob Denver, actor (Gilligan from Gilligans Island)
- Donald V. DeRosa, president, University of the Pacific
- Leon Dewan, artist
- Louis Diat, chef, creator of vichyssoise
- John Dickerson, trainer
- Kevin Dillon, actor
- Matt Dillon, actor
- Joseph J. DioGuardi, politician
- Kara DioGuardi, songwriter, judge on American Idol
- E.L. Doctorow, author, Ragtime
- Kaneji Domoto, architect
- Daniel Dorff, musician, composer
- Edward M. Douglas, businessman
- Alexander W. Dreyfoos, Jr., entrepreneur
- Elsie Driggs, painter
- Nancy Proskauer Dryfoos, sculptor
- James Dunn, actor
- Christopher Edley, Jr., class of 1970; dean of University of California, Berkeley School of Law (Boalt Hall)
- Richard Edson, actor
- Arnold Ehrlich, biblical and rabbinical scholar
- David A. Embury, attorney, author, The Fine Art of Mixing Drinks
- Grenville T. Emmet, diplomat
- Lydia Field Emmet, painter
- Robert Temple Emmet, artist
- William Le Roy Emmet, engineer
- Justus B. Entz, electrical engineer, inventor of the electromagnetic transmission
- Jean Erdman, dancer
- Ato Essandoh, television and film actor
- Anthony Walton White Evans, 19th-century civil engineer
- Bernard Evslin, author
- Tom Evslin, businessman
- Douglas Fairbanks, actor
- John Falter, artist and Saturday Evening Post illustrator
- Peter Faneuil, wealthy colonial merchant, slave trader, and philanthropist who donated Faneuil Hall to Boston
- Diane Farrell, politician, unsuccessful Democratic candidate for Connecticut's 4th congressional district in 2004 and 2006
- Charles Fazzino, 3D pop artist
- William N. Fenton, writer
- W C Fields, comedian and actor
- Annie Finch, poet
- Terry Finn, actress, original Broadway cast of Merrily We Roll Along
- Laurence Fishburne, actor, playwright, director, and producer, married to Gina Torres
- Thom Fitzgerald, theater director
- Noah Fleiss, actor
- Robert MacDonald Ford, Washington state representative
- Victor Forsythe, artist
- Kendall Foss, journalist
- Eddie Foy, Jr., actor
- Eddie Foy, Sr., actor, comedian, dancer and vaudevillian
- Sidney Frank, multi-billionaire creator of "top-shelf" liquors
- Betty Freeman, philanthropist
- Kurt O. Friedrichs, German-American mathematician
- Frankie Frisch, baseball player
- Franklin Clark Fry, leading Lutheran clergyman, known for his work on behalf of interdenominational unity
- Ed Gallagher, football player, University of Pittsburgh
- Ralph Gants, jurist
- Lou Gehrig, Hall of Fame baseball player
- Leslie H. Gelb, former president of the Council on Foreign Relations
- Charles Dana Gibson, illustrator
- Steven Gilborn, television and film actor
- Dorothy Gish, actress
- Lillian Gish, actress
- Robin Givens, film, television and stage actress
- Marty Glickman, Jewish American track-and-field athlete and sports announcer
- Barbara Goldsmith, author
- Peter Gordon, composer
- Irv Gotti, Murder Inc. CEO, record producer; Beechmont Woods
- Steve Gottlieb, music executive
- Frank Graham, writer
- Josiah Gray, MLB pitcher for the Washington Nationals
- Grand Puba, rapper
- Barry Gray, radio personality
- Courtney Greene, NFL safety
- James Gregory, stage, screen and TV actor
- Nick Gregory, meteorologist
- Della Griffin, jazz vocalist, drummer
- Ralph Guggenheim, video designer
- Molly Guion, artist
- David Hall, sound archivist, author
- Monty Hall, television personality
- Roy Hamilton, singer
- E. W. Hammons, producer
- Butch Harmon, golf instructor, grew up in New Rochelle
- Claude Harmon, golfer, lived in New Rochelle
- Alfred Harvey, creator of Richie Rich
- Greg Hawkins, hedge fund manager
- Julian Hawthorne, author
- Peter Lind Hayes, actor, lived on Icard Lane off Pelham Road
- Anthony Heald, actor
- Mary Healy, entertainer
- William Randolph Hearst, newspaper baron
- A. G. Heaton, artist, author and leading numismatist
- Henry Heimlich, creator of the Heimlich maneuver
- John Held, Jr., cartoonist
- Larry Hennessy, basketball player
- Don Hewitt, television producer
- Marion West Higgins, politician
- Dietrich von Hildebrand, philosopher
- John H. Hilldring, general
- Ron Hines, first black Ivy League-educated auto racing engineer on America's road racing circuits
- George Hirsch, publisher, New York Magazine, New York Times
- Charles J. Hite, ran Thanhouser Company
- Wilder Hobson, journalist
- Doug Hoffer, policy analyst
- Grethe Barrett Holby, producer
- Quame Holder, footballer
- Henry Holt, publisher and author
- Bill Hook, chess master
- Bronson Howard, dramatist
- Devon Hughes, professional wrestler
- Rowland Hughes, budget director
- Terrell Hughes, professional wrestler
- Terrence Hughes, professional wrestler
- Walter Beach Humphrey, illustrator
- Joseph Humphreys, boxing official
- Francis Hunter, model
- Greg Hyman (1947–2026), toy inventor who was co-creator of Tickle Me Elmo, the vibrating, giggling stuffed doll
- Jennifer Hyman, entrepreneur
- Timothy C. Idoni, three-time mayor of New Rochelle
- Adrian G Iselin, wealthy businessman; industrialist
- Charles Oliver Iselin, yachtsman; businessman
- Hope Goddard Iselin, socialite
- Mary Phelps Jacob, poet, publisher, peace activist, New York socialite
- Richard Jacobs, rabbi
- Stanley R. Jaffe, film producer
- Maryam Jameelah, author of Islamic culture and history
- Art James, TV game show host
- Boney James, saxophonist, songwriter, record producer
- Del James, musician, writer
- Edward G. Janeway
- John Jay, politician, statesman, revolutionary, diplomat, a Founding Father of the United States
- Ty Jerome, NBA basketball player
- Willem Jewett, politician
- Hans Jonas, philosopher
- Lou Jones, Olympic gold medal winner
- Scram Jones, producer
- Hugo Kafka, Czech-American architect
- Richard Kahn, president of the Academy of Motion Picture Arts and Sciences
- Michael Kaiser, president of the John F. Kennedy Center for the Performing Arts in Washington, DC
- Arthur Kallet, consumer advocate
- Brad Caleb Kane, singer
- Robert Kapilow, composer and conductor
- M. Farooq Kathwari, chairman and owner of Ethan Allen
- Walter Kauzmann, chemist, professor emeritus at Princeton
- Elia Kazan, director
- Max Keiser, broadcaster
- Adrian Lee Kellard, artist in woodwork, sculpture
- Chance Kelly, actor
- Katherine C. Kelly, activist
- Edward Winsor Kemble, cartoonist and illustrator
- Lawrence Joyce Kenney, bishop
- Jean Kerr, author and playwright
- Walter Kerr, author and playwright
- Abraham Keteltas, colonial Presbyterian clergyman
- Karen Killilea, subject of two best-selling books written by her mother (Karen and With Love From Karen)
- Joe Klein, writer
- Jonathan Klein, former head of CNN U.S.
- William Klemperer, chemist
- John Kluge, German-American television mogul (Metromedia) and billionaire
- Jerome Kohlberg, Jr., billionaire co-founder of Private Equity group KKR
- Jim Koplik, concert promoter
- Martin David Kruskal, mathematician, physicist
- Kyle Kulinski, political commentator, media host and YouTuber
- Florence La Badie, actress
- Luciano Lamonarca, opera singer
- Jacob Landau, journalist, attorney, government official, free-speech activist
- Jocelyn Lane, actress
- Joseph Langland, poet
- Jim Lansing, college football player and coach (Fordham Rams)
- Walter Lantz, producer, director, creator of Woody Woodpecker
- Susan Larson, soprano opera singer
- William Leggett, poet, writer
- Jacob Leisler, German-born American colonist, governor of New York, facilitator of settlement at New Rochelle
- Jay Leno, comedian, writer and TV personality
- Clifford J. Levy, Pulitzer Prize-winning journalist
- Mark J. Lewis, scientist
- Russell T. Lewis, newspaper executive
- Frank X. Leyendecker, illustrator
- J. C. Leyendecker, Saturday Evening Post illustrator
- John W. Lieb, electrical engineer
- Herbert Lieberman, novelist and playwright
- Leonard Lief, educator
- Sara Jane Lippincott, author
- Zachary Lipton, musician
- Lucius Littauer, businessman
- Stuart C. Lord, educator
- Errol Louis, television personality
- Tom Lovell, illustrator
- Orson Lowell, artist; illustrator
- Richard E. Lyon, illustrator
- Roger MacBride, lawyer
- Harry Macklowe, CEO, Macklowe Properties
- René-Thierry Magon de la Villehuchet, financial fund manager
- Janet Maguire, composer
- Joshua Malina, actor
- Tommy Manville, heir to asbestos fortune, socialite
- Nancy Marcus, biologist, oceanographer, and dean at Florida State University
- Branford Marsalis, Grammy Award-winning jazz musician
- Frederick Dana Marsh, artist
- Anthony Mason, basketball player
- Antoine Mason, basketball player
- Chenoa Maxwell, actress
- Robert L. May, creator of Rudolph the Red-Nosed Reindeer
- Willie Mays, Hall of Fame baseball player; lived on Croft Terrace
- Andrea McArdle, actress, Broadway's original Annie
- Roy McCardell, writer, humorist
- Bernard McEveety, film director
- John J. McGlone, scientist
- J. Raymond McGovern, lawyer
- John McGraw, baseball player and manager
- Don McLean, singer of 1971 ballad "American Pie"
- Robert H. Meltzer, painter
- Alan Menken, Academy Award-winning composer
- Robert Merrill, operatic baritone
- Jeralyn Merritt, criminal defense attorney
- Susan Metcalfe Casals, opera singer
- Truman Michelson, linguist and anthropologist
- Stanley Milgram, psychologist
- Bob Mintzer, saxophonist, composer, bandleader
- Gabriel Minvielle, original Huguenot settler, founder of New Rochelle
- Andrea Mitchell, television journalist
- Arthur Mitchell, politician
- James J. Montague, writer and poet of the early 20th century
- J.P. Morgan, industrialist
- Rob Morrow, actor
- Bill Morton, college football player and American Express executive
- Tad Mosel, playwright
- Frank Moser, film director
- Jürgen Moser, mathematician
- Henry C. Moses, educator
- Tommy Mottola, music executive
- John Cullen Murphy, illustrator of Prince Valiant
- John Joseph Nevins, auxiliary bishop, Archdiocese of Miami
- Charles Henry Niehaus, sculptor
- Timothy Noah, journalist
- Doris Nolan, actress
- Glynnis O'Connor, actress
- Gloria Oden, poet
- C. Stanley Ogilvy, mathematician
- Jennifer O'Neill, actress
- George Oppen, poet
- Frederick Burr Opper, pioneer of comic strips
- Barrie M. Osborne, film producer, 2004 Academy Award winner (Lord of the Rings)
- William O'Shaughnessy, broadcaster, author, advocate for free speech
- Muriel Ostriche, actress
- Moishe Oysher, cantor
- Cynthia Ozick, author
- George Elden Packard, bishop
- Thomas Paine, philosopher, writer, politician
- Al Parker, illustrator
- Vincent Pastore, actor, The Sopranos
- Frederick D. Patterson, educator
- Jeff Pearlman, writer
- Jan Peerce, operatic tenor
- Edward Penfield, artist
- J.C. Penney, founder of department store chain
- Bob Perciasepe, energy executive
- House Peters, Jr., character actor
- Coles Phillips, illustrator
- Joseph R. Pisani, lawyer
- Clarkson Nott Potter, politician
- Theodore Pratt, writer
- Pearl Primus, dancer
- Rudolph Douglas Raiford, decorated WWII combat officer
- William von Raab, Commissioner of the United States Customs Service
- Sendhil Ramamurthy, actor
- Perry T. Rathbone, museum director
- George Ratsey, sailor
- Albert Ray, director, actor and screenwriter
- Alex Raymond, creator of Flash Gordon; graduated Iona Prep 1927
- Jim Raymond, comic strip artist (brother of Alex Raymond)
- Della Reese, singer, actress, philanthropist; lived on Trenor Drive
- Bill Reilly, publishing executive, founder of Primedia
- Carl Reiner, actor, director, producer, writer and comedian
- Estelle Reiner, singer and actress
- Rob Reiner, actor, director, producer, writer, children's advocate and political activist
- Charles M. Relyea, illustrator
- Frederic Remington, painter and sculptor
- Charles Revson, pioneering cosmetics industry executive, created Revlon
- Joseph L. Rhinock, politician
- Ray Rice, NFL running back
- Dean Riesner, film and television writer
- Richard Riordan, mayor of Los Angeles 1993–2001
- Mariano Rivera, baseball pitcher for New York Yankees
- Norman Rockwell, visual artist, illustrator and painter
- James O. Rodgers, football player and coach
- Wayne Allyn Root, television producer, author
- Ken Rosato, journalist
- Adam Rosen, American-born British luger, Olympian
- Fred Rosen, businessman
- Gary Rosenberg, scientist
- Frank Rosenblatt, psychologist
- Lionel Rosenblatt, humanitarian, refugee advocate
- Arthur Rothstein, photojournalist
- Richard Roundtree, actor and male fashion model
- Samuel Ruben, inventor
- Louis Rukeyser, business columnist, commentator
- Merryle Rukeyser, economist, father of Louis Rukeyser and William S. Rukeyser
- William S. Rukeyser, editor of Fortune magazine
- Daniel R. Russel, diplomat and U.S. Assistant Secretary of State for East Asian and Pacific Affairs
- J.H. Ryley, singer, actor
- Sadat X, rapper, hip hop group Brand Nubian
- Jeff Sagarin, oddsmaker
- Mead Schaeffer, artist
- David Scherman, photographer
- David Schiff, composer
- Eric Schmertz, lawyer, labor negotiator
- Ruth Schönthal, pianist
- William Schurman, 18th-century businessman, legislator
- Montgomery Schuyler, artist
- Philip Schuyler, general in the American Revolution, U.S. senator
- Remington Schuyler, artist
- Peter Scolari, actor
- Gary Scott, baseball player, Chicago Cubs
- Renata Scotto, Italian soprano and opera director
- Al Seckel, author, authority on visual and sensory illusions
- Chaka Seisay, actor
- Lorenzo Semple, Jr., screenwriter
- Elizabeth Ann Seton, first native-born citizen of the United States to be canonized as a saint
- Clarine Seymour, actress
- Ilyasah Shabazz, daughter of Malcolm X; activist
- Alan Shapiro, education reformer
- Kevin Shattenkirk, professional hockey player, Anaheim Ducks
- Marlena Shaw, singer
- Robert Emmet Sherwood, actor, playwright
- Sol Shor, film and television screenwriter
- Henry Augustus Siebrecht, florist; propagated first orchids in the United States
- Horace Silver, musician
- Bill Skiff, baseball player, Pittsburgh Pirates
- Brian Slocum, baseball player
- Lawrence M. Small, president of Fannie Mae; Smithsonian Institution Secretary
- Buffalo Bob Smith, TV host, created and voiced Howdy Doody
- Paddy Smith, baseball player
- Matt Snell, football player
- Marguerite Snow, actress
- C. B. J. Snyder, architect
- Deborah Solomon, writer
- Olga Sosnovska, actress
- George L. Spaulding, songwriter
- Donald Spoto, author, born in New Rochelle
- Arnold Stang, comic actor
- Adam Stanger, musician
- John H. Starin, businessman and creator of Glen Island Resort
- George Starke, football player
- David Starobin, classical guitarist, composer of works including "New Rochelle Suite"
- Ella Rose Steers, clubwoman
- Harry Stein, author
- Joseph Stein, playwright
- Sol Steinmetz, linguistics and lexicography expert
- John Stephenson, inventor of the first U.S. street car, founded John Stephenson Company
- Frances Sternhagen, actress
- Al Sutton, filmmaker
- Andrew Svoboda, golfer
- David Tanenbaum, guitarist
- Fran Tarkenton, Hall of Fame football player, TV personality, software executive
- Benjamin I. Taylor, U.S. representative
- Teyana Taylor, musician and TV personality
- Cristina Teuscher, swimmer, Olympic gold medalist
- Edwin Thanhouser, founder of Thanhouser Film Studios
- Gertrude Thanhouser, co-founder of Thanhouser Film Studios
- Augustus Thomas, playwright
- Claude Thornhill, pianist
- George T. Tobin, illustrator
- James Henry Toole, politician
- Jean Toomer, writer
- Joe Torre, baseball player and manager (New York Yankees, Los Angeles Dodgers)
- Gina Torres, actress
- Joan Tower, contemporary composer, pianist and conductor
- Harry Traver, roller coaster designer
- George Treadwell, early 20th-century jazz trumpeter
- Jonathan Tropper, best-selling author and screenwriter
- Myra Turley, film and television actress
- John Q. Underhill, U.S. representative from New York
- Rachel Vail, children's author
- Billy Van Heusen, football player, Denver Broncos
- Clyde Vaughan, basketball player and coach
- George Vergara, football player
- Donald Verrilli Jr., lawyer, solicitor general of the United States
- Herb Voland, actor
- Harold von Schmidt, illustrator
- Heinie Wagner, shortstop for New York Giants and Boston Red Sox
- Ira Wallach, writer
- Edmund Franklin Ward, illustrator
- Ivan Warner, lawyer
- Kent Washington (born 1956), basketball player
- Burton Watson, translator
- Daniel Webster, leading statesman during the antebellum period
- Robert Walter Weir, artist, educator, historical painter
- Max Wertheimer, psychologist
- James E. West, former head of the Boy Scouts of America
- Paul Whiteman, bandleader
- Asa Whitney, merchant, promoter of Transcontinental Railroad
- Brian Wiggins, football player
- Harold Wilensky, sociologist
- Francis Wilson, actor
- H. Donald Wilson, lawyer, creator of Lexis legal system
- Malcolm Wilson, politician, former governor of New York
- John Woodruff, athlete, 1936 Summer Olympics gold medalist
- John Douglas Woodward, painter
- Ben Yagoda, journalist
- K. Aslihan Yener, archaeologist
- Molly Yestadt, milliner
- Chic Young, cartoonist, creator of Blondie
- Dean Young, cartoonist
- Whitney Young, Jr., civil rights leader
- Steven M. Zeitels, surgical innovator (voice restoration procedures) and professor
- Heinrich Zimmer, Indologist, historian of South Asian art
- Chuck Zito, actor, biker
- Rufus Fairchild Zogbaum, 19th-century illustrator, author
- Jane Zweibel, artist and art therapist
