= McGlone =

McGlone is an Irish surname. Notable people with the surname include:

- Bill McGlone (born 1984), American lacrosse player
- Jim McGlone (1897–1985), Australian rules footballer
- Joe McGlone (1896–1963), American football player
- John McGlone (1864–1927), American baseball player
- John J. McGlone (born 1955), American zoologist
- Jos McGlone rugby league footballer of the 1920s
- Mariam McGlone (1916–2008), American dancer and educator
- Matthew McGlone, American academic
- Mike McGlone (born 1972), American actor and singer
- Patsy McGlone, Northern Irish politician
- Samantha McGlone (born 1979), Canadian triathlete
- Vince McGlone (1916–2014), New Zealand seaman and television personality
- Jason McGlone (1974-2025) East Branch NY firefighter LODD 7-17-2025

== See also ==
- McGlone, West Virginia, an unincorporated community in the United States
