= Thomas Coburn =

Thomas Coburn may refer to:

- Thomas B. Coburn, president of Naropa University
- Tom Coburn (1948–2020), U.S. Senator from Oklahoma
