= New Rochelle Public Library =

Library in New Rochelle, New York

Coordinates: 40.9097°N 73.7825°W

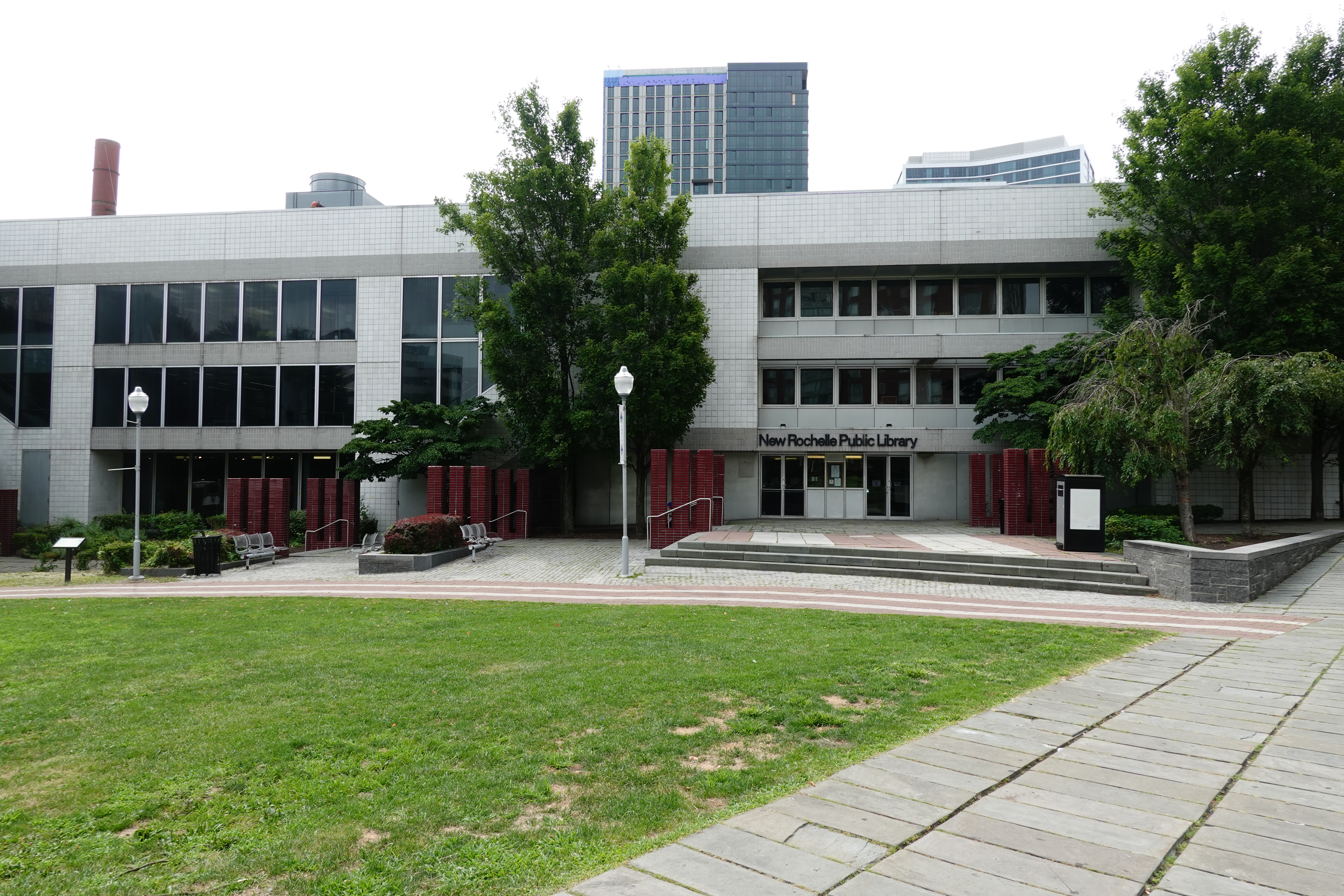
- Location: New Rochelle, New York
- Established: 1894
- Branches: 2

Collection
- Size: 260,000+ volumes

Access and use
- Population served: 72,000 + residents

Other information
- Website: http://www.nrpl.org

New Rochelle Public Library (NRPL) is a public library located in New Rochelle, New York. Chartered in 1894, the NRPL is a school-district library with its own operating budget and a board of trustees with seven elected members. The library has served the residents of New Rochelle from its main library building in the downtown business district since 1979.

The current main library, constructed in the center of the downtown business area as part of a major neighborhood revitalization project, opened to the public on September 19, 1979. Missing from this is a statement on who owns the land and the building . The building was designed by architects Pomeroy, Lebduska Associates of New York and Fred W. Lyon Associated Architects of New Rochelle. It offers 67,000 square feet of space spread over three floors. The main section of the building (60% of the total structure) was refurbished from a former parking garage, with the resulting low ceiling heights offset with the creation of a wide, central skylit area. This innovative design resulted in an 'Award of Excellence for Library Architecture' from the American Institute of Architects and the American Library Association in 1980.

Norman Rockwell's painting The Land of Enchantment hangs in the children's reading area of the main library branch.

In 2007, the New Rochelle Public Library circulated 345,238 items, answered 216,451 reference questions and loaned 98,383 items to other Westchester libraries.

The Huguenot Children's Library is located in the former Mahlstedt residence, adjacent to the "Twin Lakes" on the campus of New Rochelle High School. Formerly the "Huguenot Branch" of the Public Library, the present day children's branch is the only library in New York State to be created and supported entirely through private funds.

== Branches ==
Main Library
1 Library Plaza

Huguenot Children's Library
794 North Avenue

== History ==
The New Rochelle Public Library opened its doors for the first time in 1894. The library began with a collection of 1,857 volumes, and was created after the enactment of the New York State University Law in 1892 which provided for the separation of public and school libraries. The first library board met for organization on July 12, 1893, and with an appropriation of only $200, organized a Public library for the city which opened a few months later. On July 5, 1894, the official Library charter was issued by the New York State Board of Regents.

In 1910 New Rochelle received $60,000 from Andrew Carnegie to build a new library. The building, designed by architect Albert Randolph Ross, opened in May 1914 at Pintard Avenue and Main Street, which remained the site of the main library branch for the next 65 years.

With the growth of the northern end of the city by the 1920s, the need became evident for library facilities for that end of town. The Library Board of Trustees bought the Mahlstedt homestead in Huguenot Park where it opened a branch in 1926. Summer branches of the Library began to sprout up in the 1930s. In 1936 the Beach Library opened at Hudson Park, in 1937 weekly library service was provided for children at the city's play grounds, and in 1938 an outdoor reading room was established at Huguenot Park.

A bookmobile was purchased by the Library in 1948 to help serve residents living in the city's many outlying areas. This first Bookmobile was a trailer fitted with shelves which was towed by the Library's delivery truck. Because it was unheated, it could not be used in winter. In February 1957, a new vehicle which could hold over 3,000 books was purchased to replace the old van. This vehicle was replaced by a new air-conditioned model in 1970, but mounting repair costs and staff cutbacks necessitated retiring the Bookmobile from service in 1980.

== Links ==
- New Rochelle Library website
- Partnership for the Huguenot Childrens Library
