= Intermix =

Intermix may refer to:

- InterMix, an imprint of the Berkley Publishing Group
- Intermix Media, company which owned MySpace
- Intermix (band), 1990s band
- Intermix (fashion), a New York-based clothing company
