= New Humanitarian =

New Humanitarian may refer to:

== Institutions ==
- New Humanitarian School, a school in Moscow

== Media ==
- The New Humanitarian, a news agency formerly organised by a United Nations agency and known then as Integrated Regional Information Networks
