= Henry Moses =

Henry Moses may refer to

- Henry Moses (engraver) (1782?–1870), English engraver
- Henry Moses (politician) (1832–1926), New South Wales politician
- Harry Moses (1858–1938), Australian cricketer
- Henry C. Moses (1941–2008), American educator
