= Walter Humphrey =

Walter Humphrey may refer to:

- Walter Beach Humphrey (1892/1893–1966), American artist and educator
- Walter Davis Humphrey (1876–1942), American attorney and politician in Oklahoma

== See also ==
- Walter Humphreys (disambiguation)
