= New Rochelle High School =

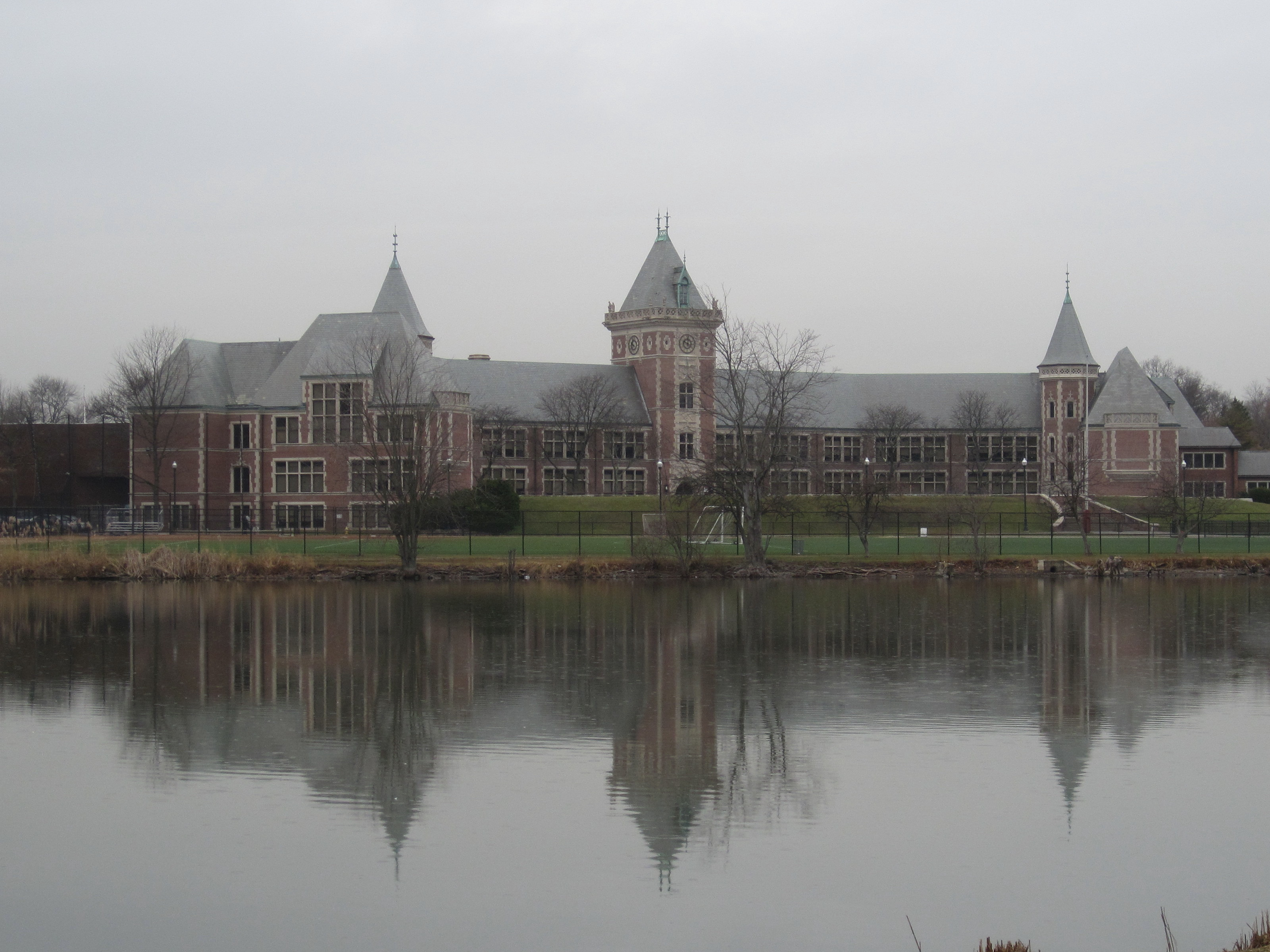
- Front of school

Location
- 265 Clove Road; New Rochelle, New York 10801; United States; 40°55′46″N 73°47′38″W

Information
- Other name: NRHS
- Former name: Woodrow Wilson Memorial High School
- Type: Public high school
- Motto: Latin: Summa Optimaque Æmulari
- Established: 1926; 100 years ago
- School district: City School District of New Rochelle
- NCES School ID: 362049001900
- Principal: Dagoberto Artiles
- Teaching staff: 216.28 (on an FTE basis)
- Grades: 9–12
- Enrollment: 3,051 (2023–2024)
- Student to teacher ratio: 14.11
- Colors: Purple, white and black
- Athletics conference: Section 1 (NYSPHSAA)
- Mascot: Huguenot; Purple Wave
- Nickname: The Huguenots
- Newspaper: The Huguenot Herald
- Website: nrhs.nred.org

New Rochelle High School (NRHS), a public secondary school in New Rochelle, New York, is part of the City School District of New Rochelle and is one of the city's two high schools, the other being Huguenot Academy. Its buildings were designed by the noted architectural firm Guilbert and Betelle and constructed in the French-Gothic style. It opened in 1926 as the Woodrow Wilson Memorial High School, but was renamed as New Rochelle High School.

The school's student body represents 60 countries. It is a two-time Blue Ribbon School and is accredited by the Middle States Association Commission on Secondary Schools. The school is organized into eight learning communities of approximately 400-600 students each.

== Campus ==
New Rochelle High School's buildings are situated at the rear of a plot of land, fronted by two lakes, and Huguenot Park. The city acquired the park's 43 acres (17 ha) of land, including what is now Twin Lakes, in 1923 as the site for the community's new high school and a park. The twin lakes were one large lake that had been used for an ice manufacturing business by the Mahlstedt family. At the southeast corner of the property is Mahlstedt House, where the family lived. In 1926, Mahlstedt House became the Huguenot Park Branch of New Rochelle Public Library, which closed in 1992, and in 1996 it became Huguenot Children's Library.

A white, marble, World War II Marines Memorial is located near the causeway leading to the High School from North Avenue. The monument was dedicated on June 3, 1949, to the 15 New Rochelle Marines who died while fighting in the war.

The school's campus was designed in the French-Gothic style by the architectural firm Guilbert and Betelle. It includes a working clock tower, indoor swimming facilities, eight tennis courts, two football fields, one combined soccer and baseball field, an outdoor track, a television station and a planetarium. The planetarium can hold 84 viewers and uses a Spitz Scidome, a 360-degree full-dome video projector with ATM-4 automation and a 5.1 surround sound audio system.

== History ==
The high school was completed in 1926 at a cost of over $1 million. It was originally named the Woodrow Wilson Memorial High School, but was removed by the city board of education and renamed to New Rochelle High School, sparking protests. On May 17, 1968, school buildings dating from the 1920s and 1930s were destroyed by arson. A 16-year-old high-school student with a history of setting fires to attract attention was arrested for the arson. Additions made to school buildings in 1959 and 1960 were not affected. Fire insurance allowed the school to rebuild while displaced students were accommodated at local junior high schools under a time-sharing arrangement.

On August 15, 2008, two months after the 40th anniversary of the 1968 arson fire that destroyed much of the school, New Rochelle High School was struck by lightning, causing a fire that severely damaged the building's distinctive spire.

During the spring 2018 semester at the school, three instances of violence involving students occurred; in an incident on January 18 of that year, a student was stabbed to death. In 2019, a student named Z'Inah Brown was sentenced to 17 years in prison for her actions in the January 2018 incident.

In 2019, the school's administrator was dismissed "for changing 212 grades for 32 students by making 'entries and changes to students' records in violation of NRHS grade-change practice and without any consistent, comprehensible or valid explanation'".

== Academics ==
The NRHS is organized into eight geographically defined learning communities of approximately 400-600 students each that serve as a home base for students and teachers. In each community, ninth and tenth grade students in are teamed with teachers in English, social studies, mathematics, and science. These teacher-student 'teams' remain intact for ninth and tenth grades to provide continuity for students and staff. Eleventh and twelfth grade students remain within their communities but most coursework occurs throughout the campus.

=== Departments ===
The school features several departments. The Arts Department is a program that integrates Art, Music, Dance and Theater Arts within the school. The school also includes a Business Education Department and its current programs of study include business, Marketing & Entrepreneurship, and Marketing and Computer Applications. The Engineering and Architectural Design Department offers courses in architectural design, architectural presentation, CADD aided residential drawing and design and drawing for production.

=== Honor societies ===
- NRHS Chapter of National Honor Society, part of a national organization. Membership is based on scholarship, community service, leadership, and character. To qualify, students must possess a minimum cumulative unweighted average of 87.0, show a minimum of 20 verifiable hours of community service, and display strong leadership qualities. Students meeting these requirements are interviewed and selected by members of the Faculty Council.
- Spanish Honor Society, open to juniors and seniors who have shown outstanding work in Spanish for a minimum of 2 1/2 years. Final acceptance is subject to review by the NRHS Foreign Language Department in accordance with the guidelines of the Sociedad Honoraria Hispanica.
- French Honor Society, open to juniors and seniors who have consistently maintained a high average in French for a minimum of 3 years.
- Latin Honor Society, open to juniors and seniors who have consistently achieved 90s in Latin for a minimum of 3 years.
- Italian Honor Society, open to juniors and seniors who have consistently maintained a high average in their years spent studying the language.
- Tri-M Music Honor Society, open to students of the Instrumental and Vocal Music Departments upon recommendation by their respective teacher.
- National Art Honor Society, members must meet select national standards in art and display a strong focus on community service.
- Math Honor Society, open to those who maintain a high average in math throughout high school
- National English Honor Society, was founded in 2008 for those who maintain a high English average throughout high school.

=== The Fund for Educational Excellence ===
The private foundation The Fund for Educational Excellence was formed to address the dramatic increase in the cost of public education by supporting aspects of the public education system that fall outside the normal operating budget. The fund was established in 1998 by the Superintendent of Schools, members of the Board of Education and community leaders. The fund has sponsored several benefit concerts featuring NRHS students at major performance venues including Carnegie Hall and Avery Fisher Hall at the Lincoln Center.

=== The Museum of Arts and Culture ===
The on-site Museum of Arts and Culture offers exhibits and programs focused on the fine arts, history, literature, science and technology. The museum opened in 2006 and is the only Regents-chartered museum in a school in the state of New York.

== Co and extra-curricular activities ==
The school has a considerable number of clubs including:

- Academic Challenge
- Animal Rights
- Art Club
- Asian Culture Club
- Auditorium Tech Crew
- Black Culture Club
- Brain cancer awareness club
- Cafe Saturnalia
- Chess Club
- Christian Culture Club
- Dance Team and Club
- Economics Team
- E.S.L. Club
- Entrepreneur Club
- French Club
- (G.R.E.E.N.) Fresh Air Club
- Gay/Straight Alliance
- General Organization (G.O.)
- Habitat for Humanity
- Hispanic Culture Club
- Hope from the Heart: Cancer Awareness Club
- Human Rights Coalition
- The Huguenot Herald
- Italian Club
- Irish culture Club
- Japanese culture Club
- Jazz band
- Jewish Culture Club
- Junior State of America
- Key Club
- Latin Club
- Marching band
- Math Honor Society Team
- Media Club
- Midnight Run
- Mock Trial Team
- Model Congress
- Muslim Culture Club
- Operation Smile Club
- Philosophy Club
- Photography Club
- Ping-pong Club
- FIRST Robotics Competition Team
- Science Club
- Science Olympiad
- Spanish Club
- Students Against Destructive Decisions (S.A.D.D)
- Student Community Action
- Ultimate Frisbee Club
- Tae Kwon Do Club
- Tech Crew
- Theatre Workshop

=== Accomplishments ===
- The school's Academic Team was ranked third in the U.S. after the 2008 National Academic Championship.
- The school's Model Congress Club is the oldest-and-longest-running high-school-level model congress in the U.S. The Model Congress originated at New Rochelle High School in 1964 when faculty advisor William P. Clarke sought an extracurricular outlet for bright students who were not engaged in sports. Richard Nixon was the guest speaker at the club's first mock presidential convention in 1964. The club is focused around debating issues through the use of bills and parliamentary procedure. The club becomes a delegation when it debates in foreign congresses, both college congresses and those associated with the United Model Congresses. Each year the school holds a Model Congress weekend, hosting "foreign delegations" from other schools.
- NRHS was the 2007 Lower Hudson Valley Regional Science Olympiad champion.
- NRHS students have been repeatedly recognized as semi-finalists and finalists in the highly competitive Intel Science Talent Search.

== Interscholastic sports ==
Fall schedule

- Varsity and Junior Varsity Cheerleading
- Boys & Girls Cross country
- Freshman Football
- Junior Varsity Football
- Varsity Football
- Boys Junior Varsity Soccer
- Boys Varsity Soccer
- Girls Junior Varsity Soccer
- Girls Varsity Soccer
- Girls Swimming
- Girls Junior Varsity Volleyball
- Girls Varsity Volleyball
- Girls Varsity Tennis
- Girls Junior Varsity Tennis
- Co-Ed Ultimate Frisbee

Winter schedule

- Varsity and Junior Varsity Cheerleading
- Boys Freshman Basketball
- Boys Junior Varsity Basketball
- Girls Junior Varsity Basketball
- Girls Varsity Basketball
- Boys Varsity ice hockey
- Boys Varsity Soccer
- Boys Varsity Indoor Track
- Girls Varsity Indoor Track
- Girls Varsity Swimming
- Boys Varsity Swimming
- Boys Varsity Volleyball
- Boys Varsity wrestling
- Boys Junior Varsity Wrestling

Spring schedule

- Boys Junior Varsity Baseball
- Boys Varsity Baseball
- Freshman Baseball()
- Varsity Golf
- Boys Junior Varsity Lacrosse
- Boys Varsity Lacrosse
- Girls Junior Varsity Lacrosse
- Girls Varsity Lacrosse
- Junior Varsity Rugby
- Varsity Rugby
- Girls Junior Varsity Softball
- Girls Varsity Softball
- Boys Junior Varsity Tennis
- Boys Varsity Tennis
- Boys Varsity Track
- Girls Varsity Track

=== Athletic accomplishments ===
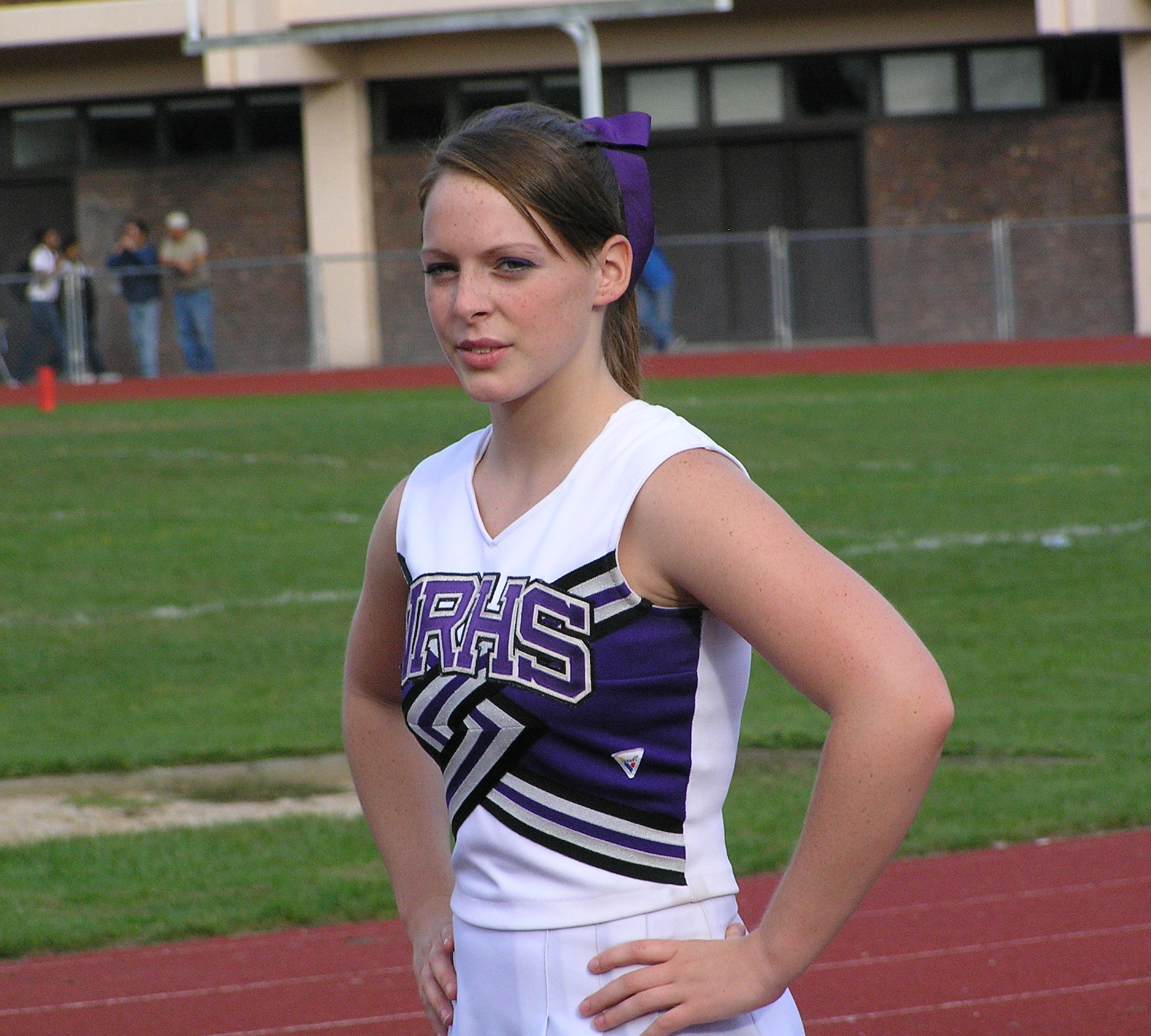
An NRHS cheerleader at a football game

- The varsity basketball team was a New York Section AA finalist in 2003 and 2013.
- The Varsity football team won the New York State title in 2003, 2012 and 2019 and was a New York State Class AA finalist in 2000, 2004 and 2009 and semi-finalist in 2007, 2008, 2010 and 2015. The team has earned the title of New York State Section 1 AA champion nine times since 2003 including five straight times from 2006 to 2010.
- The boys varsity tennis team won the 2005 New York State doubles title. The team also were league champions in 2017 and 2018.
- David Stewart (swimming '15) currently holds a NYSPHSAA Section 1 record in the men's 100-yard butterfly as of 2015.
- In 2005 NRHS student Lynne Lane set a Section 1 track record and was the 60-meter national champion.
- Throughout the years, the girls and boys track teams have won many league, county and sectional titles. In 2008 and 2010, the girls shuttle-hurdle team won national championships.
- Both the varsity and JV cheerleading teams were national champions at the 2013 Universal Cheerleading Association National HS Cheerleading Championships.
- In 2016, the boys varsity soccer team won its first Class AA New York State Championship since 1986.

== Notable alumni ==
Notable alumni sorted by graduation year.

- Theodore Pratt (1919): author
- Elia Kazan (1926): Academy Award–winning director
- Bill Morton (1927): inductee of the College Football Hall of Fame
- James Gregory (1930): stage, screen, and TV actor
- James Steen (1931): football player for the Detroit Lions
- Marion West Higgins (1932): first female Speaker of New Jersey General Assembly
- Miriam Davenport (1933): painter and sculptor who played central role in helping Jews escape the Holocaust
- Dan DeCarlo (1937): cartoonist, developed look of Archie Comics, created Josie and the Pussycats
- Henry Heimlich (1937): inventor, Heimlich Maneuver
- Edward Wellen (1937): mystery and science fiction writer
- Betty Freeman (1939): photographer and philanthropist
- Gloria Oden (1939): African American poet
- Rosemarie Beck (1941): artist, teacher
- Don Hewitt (1940): 60 Minutes producer
- Tad Mosel (1940): Pulitzer Prize–winning playwright
- Jerome Kohlberg Jr. (1943): billionaire cofounder of private equity firms KKR and Kohlberg & Co.
- Kay Christopher (1944): actress and model
- William Klemperer (1944): chemical physicist and molecular spectroscopist
- Richard Kahn (1947): president, Academy of Motion Picture Arts and Sciences
- Joseph R. Pisani (1947): lawyer and politician
- Lou Jones (1950): Olympic gold medalist sprinter
- Louis Rukeyser (1950): financial journalist
- Jesse Arnelle (1950): football and basketball player at Penn State
- Anthony Charles Beilenson (1950): Democratic Congressman
- Henry C. Moses (1951): educator (Dean of Freshmen at Harvard; headmaster Trinity School)
- Jacob Landau (1952): journalist, attorney, and free-speech activist (founding executive director of Reporters Committee for Freedom of the Press)
- Leslie H. Gelb (1955): Council on Foreign Relations president
- Harry Macklowe (1955): chairman and CEO, Macklowe Properties Real Estate Investment
- William S. Rukeyser (1957): journalist
- Ken Blanchard (1957): management expert, coauthor of The One Minute Manager
- Johnny Counts (1958): New York Giants running back
- Drew S. Days III (1959): Solicitor General of the United States, Professor of Law at Yale Law School
- Lawrence M. Small (1959): 11th Secretary of Smithsonian Institution
- Fred Rosen (1961): attorney, business executive and philanthropist
- Richard Roundtree (1961): actor, best known as film's John Shaft
- Barrie M. Osborne (1962): film producer, 2004 Academy Award winner (The Lord of the Rings: The Return of the King)
- Butch Harmon (1962): golf professional, former coach of Tiger Woods
- Andrea Mitchell (1963): journalist
- Russell T. Lewis (1965): CEO of The New York Times Company
- Jeff Sagarin (1966): sports statistician
- George Starke (1966): tackle, Washington Redskins
- Harry Stein (1966): author and columnist
- Alan Menken (1967): composer, lyricist
- Jeralyn Merritt (1967): criminal defense attorney, legal analyst, blogger
- Ralph Guggenheim (1969): video graphics designer, 1995 "Producers Guild of America Award" winner (Toy Story)
- David Pecker (1969): publishing executive and businessman, CEO of American Media
- Guy Davis (1970): musician, son of actors Ossie Davis and Ruby Dee
- Gloria Borger (1970): political analyst for CNN
- Christopher Edley Jr. (1970): Dean of University of California, Berkeley School of Law
- Michael Kaiser (1971): president of John F. Kennedy Center for the Performing Arts
- Glynnis O'Connor (1973): actress
- Al Seckel (1976): writer, specialist on illusions, creator of Darwin fish design
- Jane Zweibel (1977), visual artist
- Stuart C. Lord (1978): educator
- Rachel Vail (1984): children's author
- Kent Washington (1983): basketball player
- Clifford J. Levy (1985): Pulitzer Prize–winning journalist
- Noam Bramson (1987): mayor of New Rochelle
- Craig Carton (1987): sports radio personality
- Devon Hughes (1990): professional wrestler "Brother Devon", formerly known as "D-Von Dudley"
- Ato Essandoh (1990): actor, known for Chicago Med
- Cristina Teuscher (1996): Olympic gold medalist swimmer
- Jennifer Hyman (1998): entrepreneur
- Adam Rosen (2002): American-born British luger Olympian
- Tom Koehler (2004): Former MLB pitcher, spent seasons with Miami Marlins and Toronto Blue Jays
- Courtney Greene (2005): former Jacksonville Jaguars free safety
- Ray Rice (2005): former Baltimore Ravens running back, three-time Pro Bowler, Super Bowl XLVII champion
- Kyle Kulinski (2006): YouTuber and political commentator, co-founder of Justice Democrats
- Antoine Mason (2010): Basketball player
- Jordan Lucas (2011): Defensive back for Chicago Bears, Super Bowl LIV champion
- Josiah Gray (2015): Pitcher for the Washington Nationals
- Manny Rodriguez (2015): sports radio personality on WFAN and WFAN-FM
- Emil Michael: Former Senior Vice President of Business at Uber
