= Molly Yestadt =

American fashion designer

- Education: Fashion Institute of Technology; Columbia University
- Occupation: Milliner

Molly Yestadt is an American milliner.

== Life ==
She studied fine arts at University of Hartford, transferred to the Fashion Institute of Technology in New York City, and is completing her Masters of Science at Columbia University in Sustainability Management.

She worked as an apprentice at millinery design studio Cha Cha’s House of Ill Repute from 2004 to 2007, and as a designer for Steve Madden from 2007 to 2009 and launched her business shortly after.

In Spring 2009, fashion retailer Intermix started carrying some of Yestadt's designs. Later that same year, a model wore a hat of Yestadt's at a photo shoot with Alister Mackie, then stylist for Marc by Marc Jacobs, and the design caught the stylist's eye. This resulted in a collaboration with Marc by Marc Jacobs that significantly raised Yestadt's profile.

== Work ==
Yestadt has collaborated with designers such as Marc Jacobs, Vena Cava, Thom Browne, and Phillip Lim. Her works with Yestadt also have a number of celebrity fans, among them Rihanna and Courtney Love. A number of retailers carry or have carried Yestadt's designs, including Intermix, Anthropologie, Henri Bendel, Barney's CO-OP, and The Hat Store.

While a number of high fashion figures started out as milliners, such as Halston and Coco Chanel, the art of hatmaking has had a comparatively lower profile in the latter half of the 20th century and beginning of the 21st, possibly as a result of the woman's wardrobe becoming more casual and informal.
