= Naropa University =

University in Boulder, Colorado, United States

Coordinates: 40°0′51″N 105°15′59″W

- Former name: Naropa Institute (1974–1999)
- Type: Private university
- Established: 1974; 52 years ago
- Founder: Chögyam Trungpa
- Accreditation: HLC
- Religious affiliation: Shambhala Buddhism
- Endowment: $8.34 million (2019)
- President: Paul Burkhardt
- Faculty: 164
- Undergraduates: 402
- Postgraduates: 617
- Location: Boulder, Colorado, United States
- Campus: 12 acres (0.049 km^{2}); Midsize City
- Colors: Heather Purple
- Nickname: Bodhi Cheetahs
- Website: www.naropa.edu

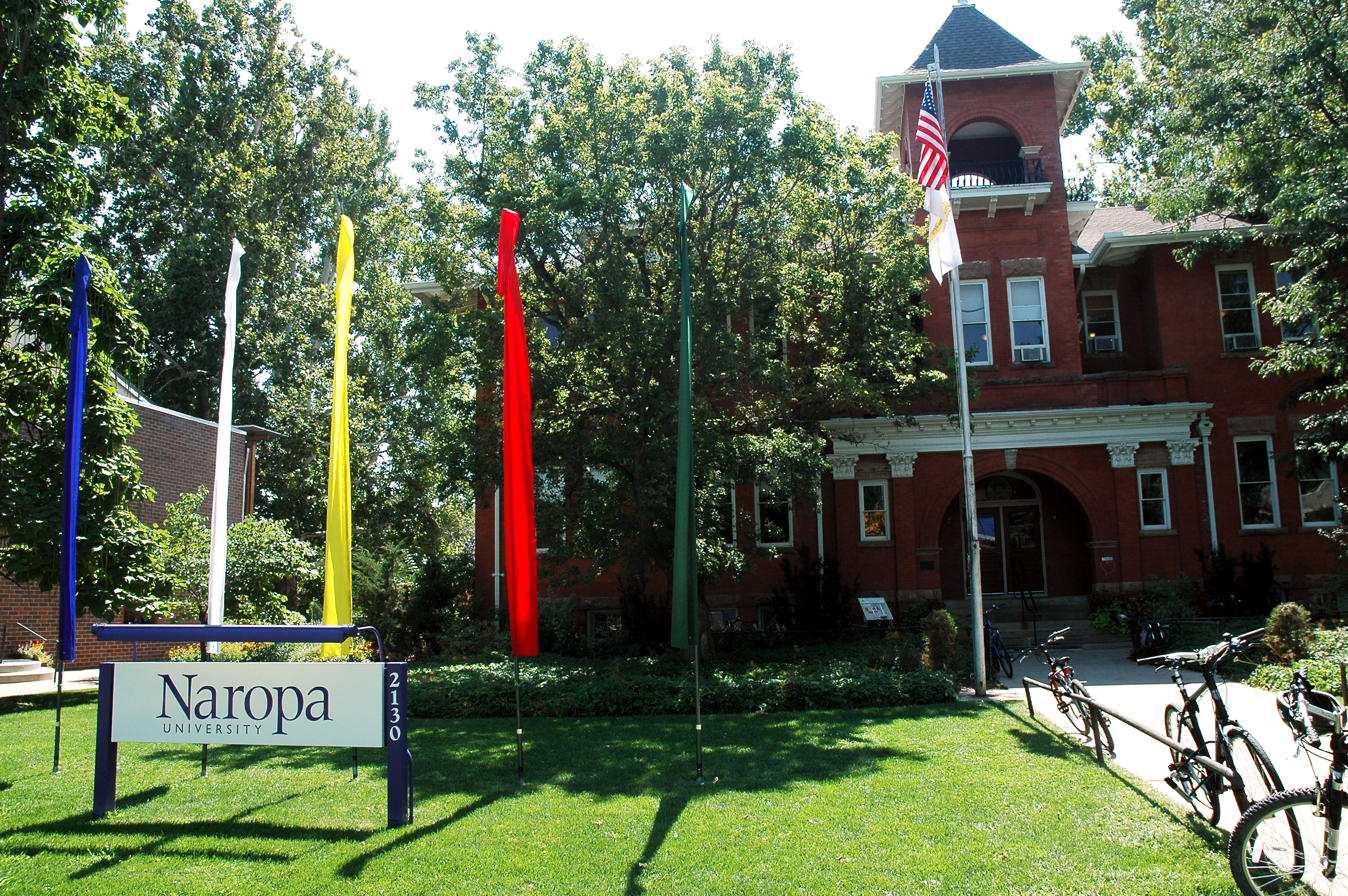
Naropa's main Arapahoe Campus, as seen from Arapahoe Avenue

Naropa University is a private university in Boulder, Colorado, United States. Founded in 1974 by Tibetan Buddhist teacher Chögyam Trungpa, it is named after the 11th-century Indian Buddhist sage Naropa, an abbot of Nalanda. The university describes itself as Buddhist-inspired, ecumenical, and nonsectarian rather than Buddhist. Naropa promotes non-traditional activities like meditation to supplement traditional learning approaches.

Naropa was accredited by the North Central Association of Colleges and Schools in 1988, making it the first Buddhist-inspired academic institution to receive United States regional accreditation. It remains one of only a handful of such schools. The university has hosted a number of Beat poets under the auspices of its Jack Kerouac School of Disembodied Poetics.

== History ==
Naropa University was founded by Chögyam Trungpa, an exiled Tibetan tulku who was a Karma Kagyu and Nyingma lineage holder. Trungpa entered the US in 1970, established the Vajradhatu organization in 1973, and then in 1974, established Naropa Institute under the Nalanda Foundation. Initially, the Nalanda Foundation and Vajradhatu were closely linked, having nearly identical boards of directors. In subsequent years they differentiated into more independent institutions.

Trungpa asked poets Allen Ginsberg, Anne Waldman, and Diane di Prima, and the composer John Cage to found a poetics department at Naropa during the first summer session. Ginsberg and Waldman, who roomed together that first summer, came up with the name for the Jack Kerouac School of Disembodied Poetics.

Naropa's first formal degree programs were offered in 1975–76. These included a BA in Buddhist studies and visual art, MA in psychology, MFA in visual art, and expressive arts certificates in dance, theater, and poetics.

The MA in psychology was originally designed as an extension of Trungpa's Maitri program, a 16-week meditation course held in Connecticut, and based on Vajrayana teachings on esoteric energy patterns within the mind and body. Trungpa asked Marvin Casper to restructure the Maitri program for use at Naropa as a full-fledged graduate degree program in contemplative psychotherapy. Casper went on to chair that department and edit two of Trungpa's books. Initially for the degree, students were required to attend three of the institute's summer sessions, take two Maitri programs in Connecticut, and complete a six-month independent project.

In 1977, at Trungpa's urging, Naropa's administration made the decision to seek regional accreditation. Evaluation visits continued through 1986, and in 1988, Naropa Institute received accreditation from the North Central Association of Colleges and Schools. In the mid-1980s, Naropa's president, Barbara Dilley, asked Lucien Wulsin to chair the board of directors. One of Wulsin's first acts was to formally separate Naropa from Vajradhatu. Ties with Vajradhatu were further weakened with the physical relocation of Vajradhatu's main center to Halifax, and then by Trungpa's death in 1987.

In 1991 Naropa's board of trustees hired John Cobb, a Harvard-educated lawyer and practicing Buddhist, as president. Thomas B. Coburn served in this role from 2003 to 2009, succeeded by Stuart C. Lord in July 2009.

The university began engaging in electrophysiology research at The Graduate School of Counseling and Psychology when the university introduced new equipment for the study of heart rate variability, galvanic skin response, and respiration during 2012 - 2014. Later, Jordan Quaglia, PhD established the Cognitive and Affective Sciences Laboratory to study Electroencephalography (EEG) to monitor brainwave patterns in 2016 - 2017.

In August 2024 Naropa announced it was selling its main "Arapahoe" campus (2130 Arapahoe Ave). The "Nalanda" campus (6287 Arapahoe Ave) will be retained. The announcement said "With over 40% of students (and a significant portion of staff and faculty) now operating primarily in hybrid and virtual spaces, we are redefining the very essence of what it means to be a community."

== Spiritual principles ==
Naropa promotes contemplative education – a term used primarily by teachers associated with Naropa University or Shambhala Buddhist organizations – including activities such as meditation, the Japanese tea ceremony, taijiquan, Christian labyrinth, ikebana, and neo-pagan ritual. Robert Goss comments that

Geoffrey Samuel, Reginald Ray, and Judith Simmer-Brown have traced the Shambhala lineage [Trungpa's teaching] back to the 19th century Rimé movement in Eastern Tibet... When Naropa describes itself as a Buddhist-inspired, nonsectarian liberal arts college, "nonsectarian" translating to the Tibetan rimed. Nonsectarian does not, however, mean secular as it is commonly used in higher education. Nonsectarian is perhaps understood as ecumenical openness to contemplative practices and arts of the world religious traditions that foster precision, gentleness, and, spontaneity.

Goss goes on to note that as with many U.S. Protestant and Catholic colleges and universities, Naropa has faced pressure to establish independence from its associated religious organization, Shambhala International; but unlike many such institutions, it has avoided relegating religion to the periphery of university life.

Naropa's description of contemplative education makes liberal use of Buddhist language and concepts. For example, its catalogue speaks of "students wholeheartedly engag[ing] in mindfulness awareness practices in order to cultivate being present in the moment...the development of openness, self-awareness, and insight", and frames "interior work" as "preparation for compassionate and transformative work in the world."

== Notable alumni ==
- Gregory Alan Isakov
- Brenda Coultas
- Bunky Echo-Hawk
- Justine Frischmann
- Diane Musho Hamilton
- Tim Z. Hernandez
- Lesléa Newman
- Jonathan Siegrist
- Cedar Sigo
- Eleni Sikelianos
- Brad Will

== See also ==
- Buddhist universities and colleges in the United States
