= Contemplative psychotherapy =

Practice method of psychotherapy

Contemplative psychotherapy is an approach to psychotherapy that incorporates personal contemplative practices and insights informed by the spiritual tradition of Buddhism. Contemplative psychotherapy differs from more traditional methods of counseling in that the therapist brings qualities of mindfulness and compassion to the therapeutic relationship, helping clients access their fundamental goodness and natural wisdom. The practice of contemplative psychotherapy emerged from a dialogue between Tibetan Buddhist master Chögyam Trungpa Rinpoche and Western psychologists and psychiatrists. This dialogue led to the establishment of the Contemplative Psychotherapy Department at Naropa University in 1978, founded by Edward M. Podvoll, a psychiatrist, psychoanalyst, and dedicated student of Trungpa.

Contemplative psychotherapy is said to have two primary influences: the 2,500-year-old wisdom tradition of Buddhism and the clinical traditions of Western psychology, particularly the Humanistic school. Like all offspring, it shares characteristics with both "parents" while remaining uniquely its own. From Buddhism, it draws the practice of mindfulness/awareness meditation and a highly sophisticated understanding of how the mind functions in both sanity and confusion. From Western psychology, it adopts the investigation of human developmental stages, a precise language for discussing mental disturbances, and the intimate, client-centered approach known as "psychotherapy."

The foundational teaching of the contemplative psychotherapy program is the concept of "brilliant sanity." This principle asserts that everyone possesses an innate dignity and wisdom. Practitioners of contemplative psychotherapy are trained to recognize this inherent sanity, even within the most confused and distorted states of mind, and to nurture it in both themselves and their clients.

== Core ideas ==
=== Brilliant sanity ===
The basic premise of contemplative psychotherapy rests on the notion of "brilliant sanity", which suggests that we all have within us a natural dignity and wisdom and that our basic nature is characterized by clarity, openness, and compassion. This wisdom may be temporarily covered over, but it is there and may be cultivated. Practitioners of contemplative psychotherapy become experts at recognizing sanity within even the most confused and distorted states of mind and are trained to nurture this sanity in themselves and in their clients.

=== Contemplative practice ===
Buddhist psychology emphasizes the primacy of immediate experience. In the training of a contemplative psychotherapist, theoretical training is balanced with experiential training. By studying and experiencing his or her own mind, the contemplative therapist can then study and experience accurately the mind of others while engaging in therapeutic practices. The study of one's own mind can be achieved through meditation practice and body/mind awareness disciplines.

=== Maitri space awareness ===
Space awareness practice is designed to intensify and familiarize oneself with different emotional and psychological states: both the "wisdom" aspects and the confused aspects. Maitri space awareness practice, when integrated with sitting meditation within a community environment, can assist practitioners in recognizing their own patterns, become friendly toward themselves in different states of mind, and develop genuine humor and compassion toward themselves and others. This often leads to relaxation and fearlessness in working with others.

=== Body, speech and mind practice ===
Contemplative psychotherapy makes use of the Body-Speech-Mind approach to clinical supervision as a way to bring the client, the client's world and the therapeutic relationship (as experienced by the contemplative psychotherapist) vividly into the group supervisory situation. This presence in turn is used to directly facilitate working with energetic and conceptual obstacles and provides a basis for subsequent therapeutic interventions.
