= Walter Beach Humphrey =

American artist (1890s–1966)

- Born: 1892/1893; Elkhorn, Wisconsin, US
- Died: October 11, 1966 (aged 73); Glens Falls, New York, US
- Education: Dartmouth College (1914)
- Occupations: Illustrator; painter; teacher
- Spouse: Constance Morton
- Children: 2

Walter Beach Humphrey (1892/1893 – 1966) was an American artist and educator.

== Personal life ==
Walter Beach Humphrey was born in Elkhorn, Wisconsin in 1892 or 1893. He graduated Dartmouth College in 1914. Upon his October 11, 1966 death in Glens Falls, New York, he was married to Constance Morton and had two children, five grandchildren, and a great-grandchild.

== Career ==
In addition to teaching at the University of Chicago, Bradley University, and the New York University School of Commerce, Humphrey also taught commercial art at New Rochelle High School from 1941 to 1963. Outside of teaching, he painted murals for Dartmouth College; served on the New Rochelle, New York art commission; painted portraits; illustrated books; and created covers for The Saturday Evening Post.
