= Donald V. DeRosa =

American academic administrator (1941–2026)

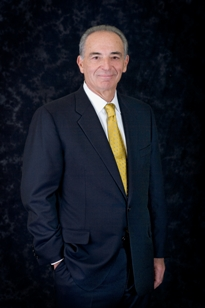
Don DeRosa

Donald V. DeRosa (March 3, 1941 – April 1, 2026) was an American academic administrator who was the 23rd president of the University of the Pacific, serving from 1995 to 2009. In July 2009 he was named President Emeritus by the Board of Regents.

== Background ==
DeRosa was born in New Rochelle, New York, and grew up in Eastchester, New York. He graduated from American International College (Springfield, Massachusetts) and held a Masters and PhD in psychology from Kent State University. DeRosa taught and served as chair of the Department of Psychology at Bowling Green State University (1968–1985) and was graduate dean and provost at the University of North Carolina at Greensboro (1985–1995).

== University of the Pacific ==
DeRosa was named President of the University of the Pacific in 1995. His presidency has been described as transformative and historic. Most notable during his presidency were the establishment of the Brubeck Institute, a 400% increase in undergraduate applications, over 200 million dollars in new and renovated facilities, and the ranking of Pacific as a top 100 University by US News.

In 2007, he secured a 100 million dollar estate gift from Robert and Jeannette Powell: at the time one of the largest single gifts ever received by a college or University. Shortly thereafter the university concluded a highly successful 330 million dollar campaign.

In 2008, Pacific's Board of Regents named the newly constructed university center the Don and Karen DeRosa University Center.

== Death ==
DeRosa died on April 1, 2026, at the age of 85.
