= Robert H. Meltzer =

American painter (1921–1987)

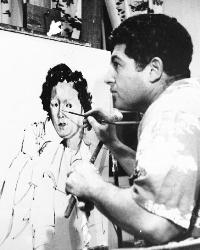
Robert H. Meltzer, American Artist

Robert Hiram Meltzer (October 18, 1921 – August 2, 1987) was an American painter and instructor, best known for his versatility in the field of watercolors.

== Early life ==
Meltzer' was born in New Rochelle, New York on October 18, 1921. He began his career in 1932 by apprenticing himself to New York-based illustrators including Hunter Barker, Edward Joseph Dreany, and Charles Ross Kinghan in their studios on Division Street in New Rochelle.

== Military service ==
After volunteering for military service in the U.S. Navy in 1938, Meltzer served in the Pacific Theatre during World War II on various submarines including the Salmon-Class Snapper and Sargo-Class Seadragon. Following World War II, Meltzer was recalled to active duty in the Navy as a combat artist during the Korean Action.

== Education and influences ==
Meltzer received a Bachelor of Fine Arts (BFA) degree from Southern Methodist University (SMU), and a Master of Fine Arts (MFA) degree from University of Hawaiʻi. He also attended the Art Students League of New York and the Jean Morgan School of Art. At the latter, he learned sketching and composition from newspaper and battlefield sketch artist Wallace Morgan. Meltzer also attended the School for Art Studies, where he learned techniques from artists Robert Benney and Sol Wilson.

One of the greatest influences in Meltzer's artistic development was Louis Henri Jean Charlot. Charlot was a master teacher at the University of Hawaii when Meltzer was completing his MFA. Meltzer was impressed by Charlot's emphasis on scholarship, which led to Meltzer's artistic focus on Native American, American Southwest, and rural California landscape subjects.

== Sports ==
Meltzer was a member of SMU's championship football squads in 1947 and 1948. He was the 1958 Amateur Athletic Union (AAU) Heavyweight Weightlifting Champion for the then-territory of Hawaii. Meltzer learned weightlifting from both Olympian gold and silver-medal holder and Mr. World and Mr. Universe title-holder Tommy Kono and Dr. Peter T. George, captain of the 1952 (Helsinki) and 1956 (Melbourne) U.S. Olympic Weightlifting teams. Meltzer painted portraits of both Kono and George. The George portrait, which depicted Dr. George in his Olympic jacket and tie, was destroyed in a fire. During his weightlifting period in Hawaii, Meltzer served as a volunteer lifeguard at Ala Moana Beach in Honolulu.

== Career ==
Meltzer moved from Hawaii to California in 1959. In 1967, Meltzer was elected to the American Watercolor Society. From the mid-1970s until his death in 1987, Meltzer was an important influence in bringing professional watercolor instruction to students throughout the United States. Through Crafton Hills College in Yucaipa, California, Meltzer ran a series of watercolor seminars which included as instructors Phil Dike (1906–1990), Dong Kingman (1911–2000), Millard Owen Sheets (1907–1989), Robert E. Wood (1926–1999), and other noted American watercolorists.

Meltzer's works are included in the collections of the Edward-Dean Museum in Cherry Valley, California; San Bernardino City Hall, San Bernardino, California; and the United States Naval Archives, Washington, D.C. Meltzer's work is also part of the Smithsonian Museum's collection of wooden Easter Eggs commissioned by the White House in 1981. Meltzer received a telegram informing him that he was among 70 American artists, including Andy Warhol and “Peanuts” cartoonist Charles M. Schulz, invited to “paint or decorate wooden egg replicas” for an Easter display at the White House. Meltzer's two submissions captured cattle grazing in the pasturelands of Beaumont, California and a herd of horses from Banning, California.

== Representative works ==
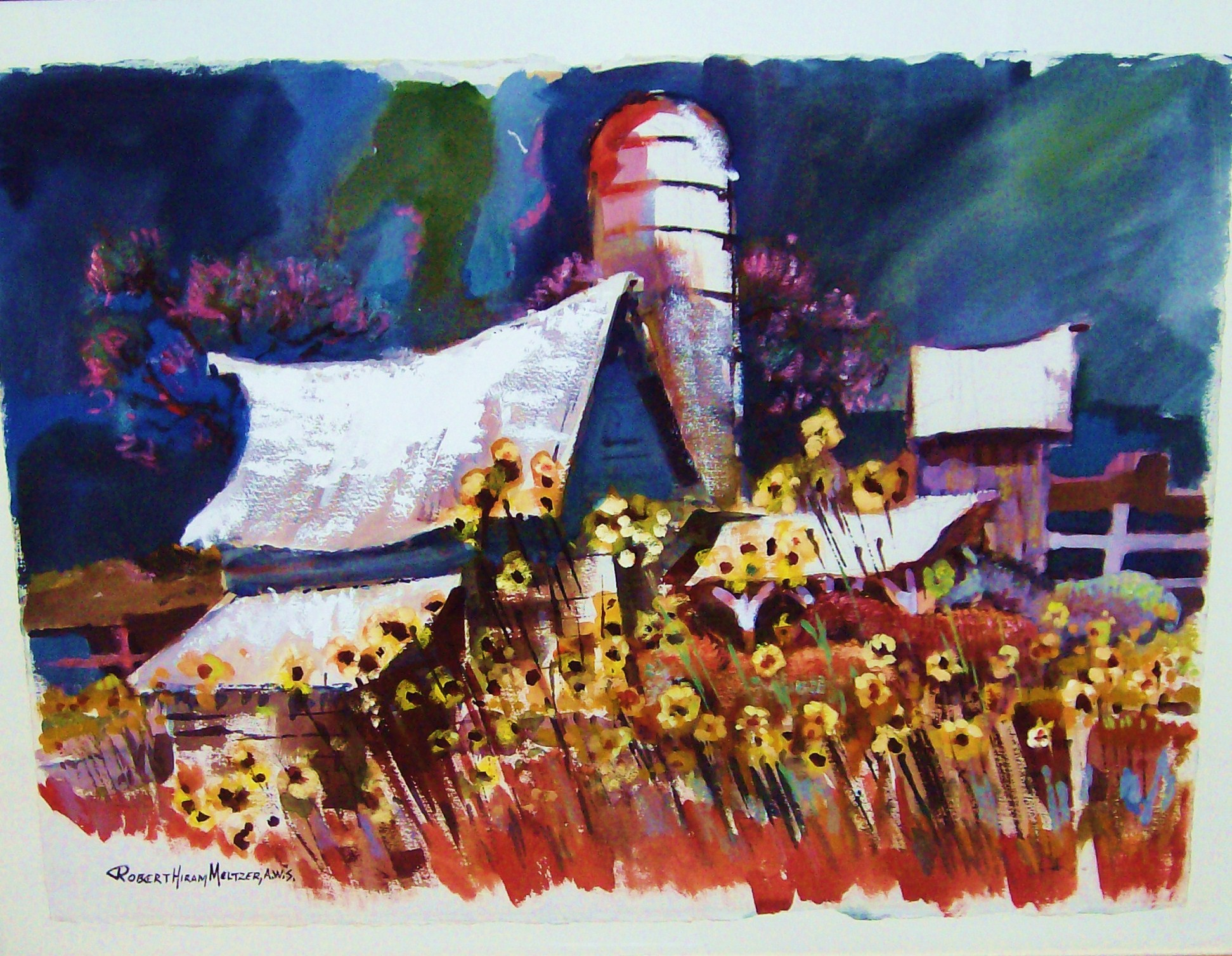
Sunflower Barn

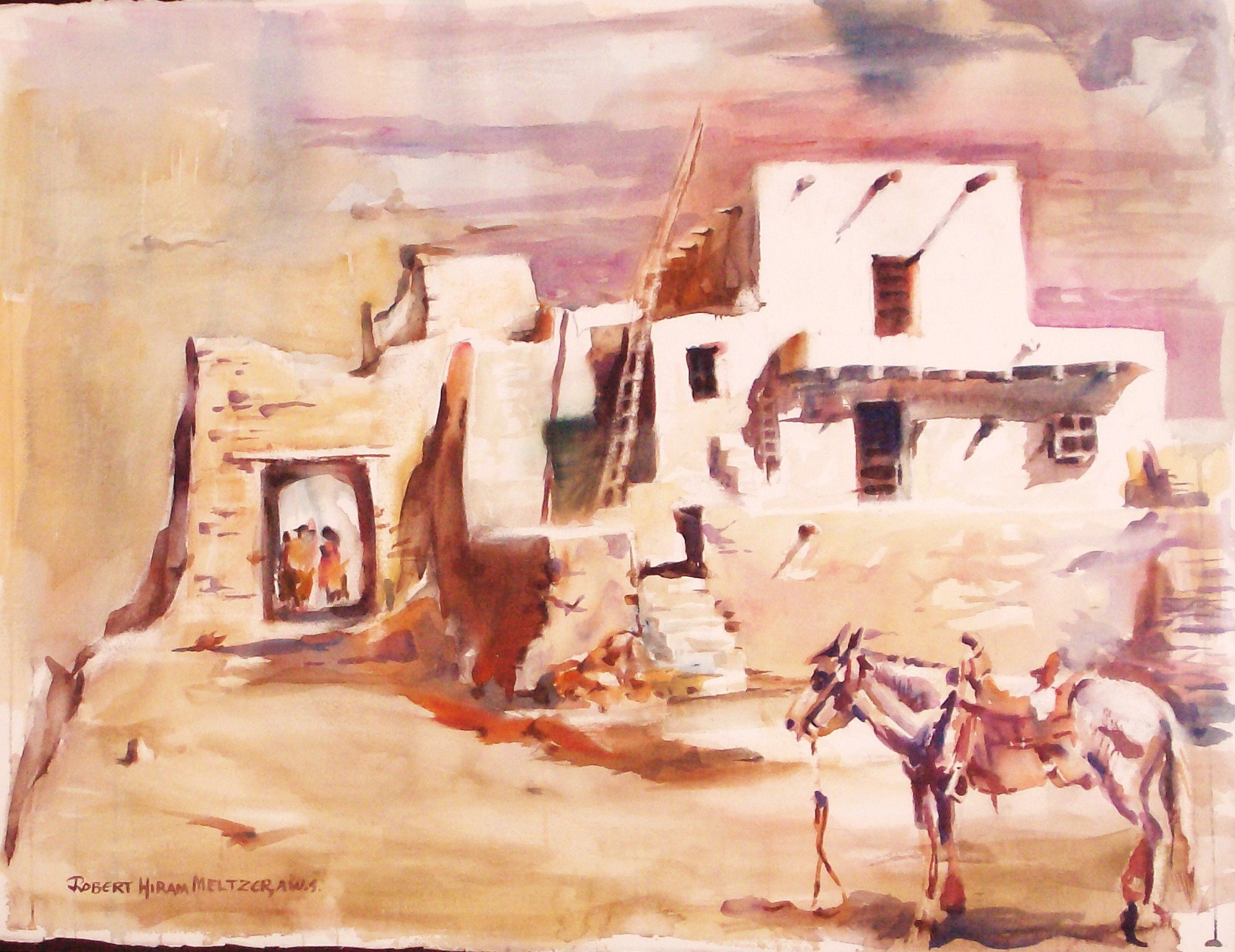
Taos Pueblo Scene

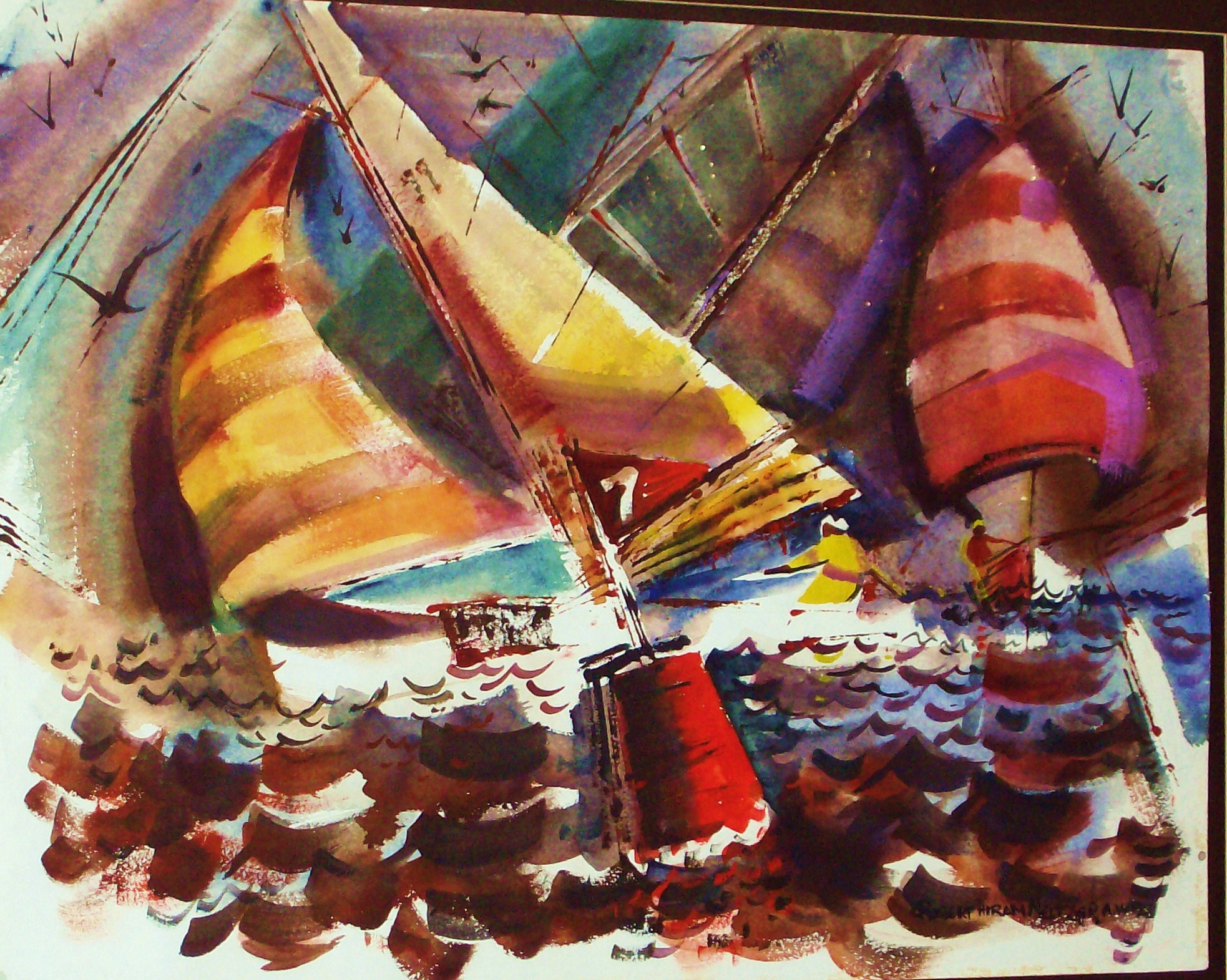
Regatta on the Severn, Annapolis, Maryland
