= Gloria Borger =

American journalist

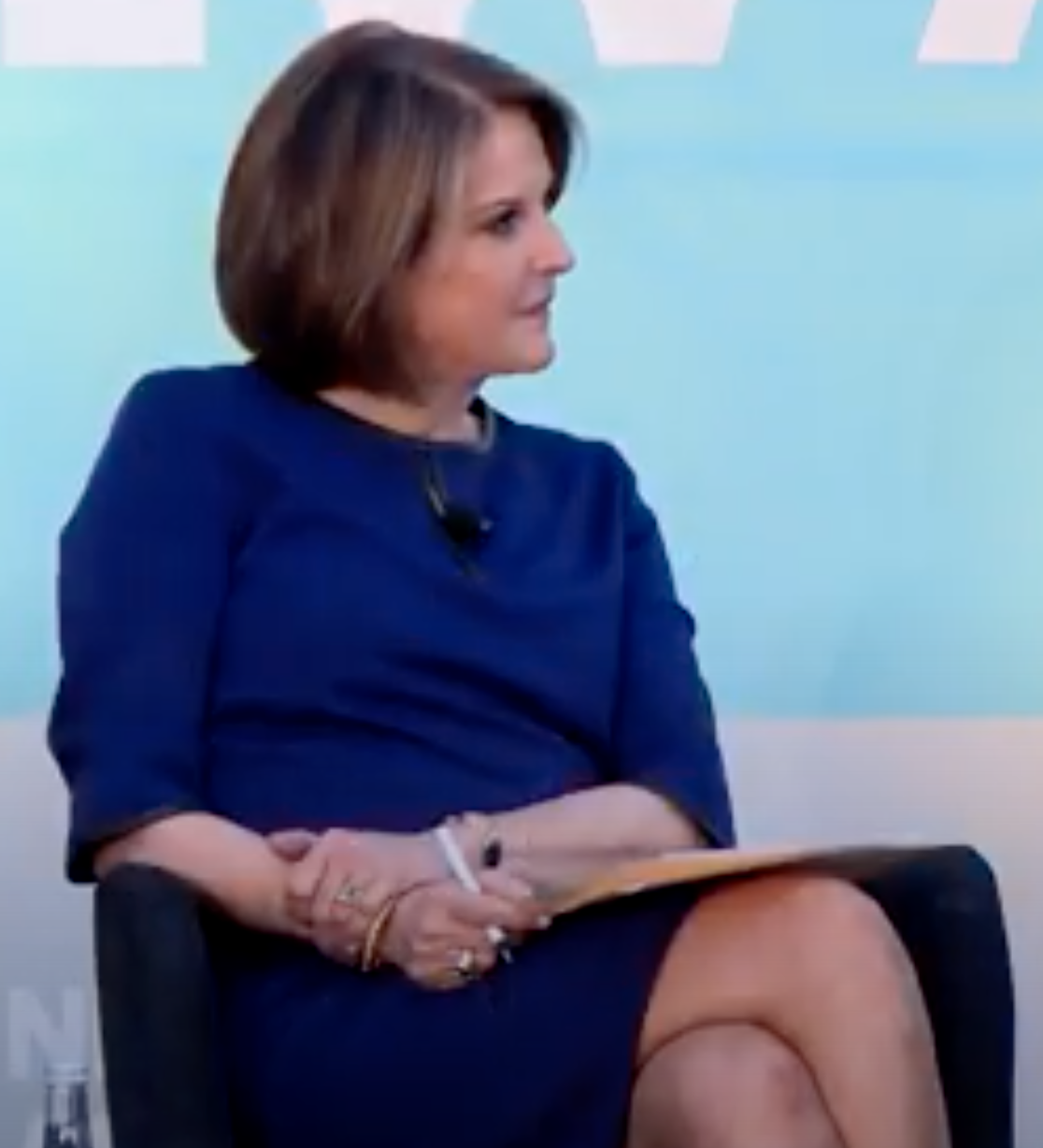
- Borger in April 2015
- Born: Gloria Anne Borger; September 22, 1952 (age 73); New Rochelle, New York, U.S.
- Education: New Rochelle High School; Colgate University
- Occupations: Analyst; Journalist
- Employer: CNN
- Known for: Senior political analyst, CNN; former chief political analyst, CNN; former anchor, CNBC; former correspondent, CBS News; Panelist, Washington Week
- Spouse: Lance Morgan (m. 1974)
- Children: 2

Gloria Anne Borger (born September 22, 1952) is an American political pundit, journalist, and columnist. As a senior political analyst for CNN from 2007 to 2024, she appeared on a variety of their shows, including The Situation Room.

Borger was previously the national political correspondent for CBS News, where she appeared on Face the Nation and 60 Minutes II. From 2002 to 2004, Borger was co-anchor of CNBC's Capital Report. Prior to that, she was a contributing editor and columnist for U.S. News & World Report magazine. In 1979, Borger covered the Three Mile Island accident for Newsweek.

== Early life and education ==
Borger was born on September 22, 1952, in New Rochelle, New York and grew up there. She attended New Rochelle High School, where she graduated in 1970. She then attended Colgate University in Hamilton, New York, where she graduated in 1974. She was born into a Jewish family, and her father owned an electrical distribution company named Borger's.

== Awards and honors ==
In 2008, she was part of CNN's Peabody Award-winning coverage of the 2008 presidential primary campaigns and debates.

In 2011, Borger received an Emmy nomination for "The Odd Couple", which profiled attorneys David Boies and Theodore Olson.

In 2013, she was part of the team awarded a Primetime Emmy Award for "Outstanding Live Coverage" for CNN's 2012 election night coverage

In 2014, Borger received a National Headliners Award for program Marriage Warriors: Showdown at the Supreme Court, broadcast on CNN on March 13, 2013.

== Personal life ==
Borger lives in Washington, D.C., with her husband, Lance Morgan, a public relations executive. She has two sons. Her son Evan is married to Mary Anne Huntsman, daughter of politician Jon Huntsman Jr.
