= Mahlstedt's Ice Pond =

Mahlsdet's Ice Pond
- Huguenot Lake
- Location within New York
- Location: New Rochelle, Westchester County, New York
- Coordinates: 40°55′48″N 73°47′29″W
- Type: man-made lake
- Basin countries: United States
- Surface area: 14 acres (5.7 ha)
- Water volume: 56 acre⋅ft (69,000 m^{3})
- Surface elevation: 21 m (69 ft)

Mahlstedt's Ice Pond, commonly referred to as Huguenot Lake, is a man-made lake located in central New Rochelle in Westchester County, New York. Constructed in 1885, the lake is impounded by the Mahlstedt Reservoir Dam on a tributary of Pine Brook. The dam is of earthen construction and rock fill, with a height of 15 feet (4.6 m) and a length of 7,000 feet (2,100 m). It has a normal surface area of 14 acres (5.7 ha), a capacity of 70 acre-feet (86,000 m^{3}), and normal storage of 56 acre-feet (69,000 m^{3}).

For years the lake served as a water supply source for nearby Mount Vernon as well as a successful ice supply business. Several generations of the Mahlstedt family harvested ice from the lake, however, after refrigeration made the once-lucrative business obsolete, the family sold the lake and adjoining property to the city in 1922. The lake is currently part of Huguenot Park and the New Rochelle High School campus. It is currently used for recreational and environmental purposes.

== Freshwater wetland and stream restoration ==
A restoration project on the extended campus grounds of New Rochelle High School was completed to stabilize the eroding banks along Stephenson Brook. The banks were regraded, biodegradable support structures were installed for additional support, and the area was planted with perennials, shrubs and trees to purify the water and keep the banks permanently stabilized. Upland vegetation was also added along the shoreline of Huguenot Lake to control erosion and enhance habitat for wildlife. Yellow Iris, Blue Flag Iris, and reindeer moss were added because they naturally filter pollutants including nitrogen and phosphorus, as well as enhancing the aesthetics of the lake's shoreline.
