= Clifford J. Levy =

American journalist (born 1967)

Clifford J. Levy in 2012.

Clifford J. Levy (born June 15, 1967, in New Rochelle, New York) is deputy publisher of two New York Times Company publications, the Wirecutter and The Athletic. He is a two-time Pulitzer Prize winner and was considered one of the main architects of the digital transformation of The New York Times in the 2010s. In 2024, The Washington Post and CNN both tried to recruit Levy to run their newsrooms, but he ended up staying at The Times.

Levy is a graduate of New Rochelle High School and Princeton University in 1989.

== New York Times ==
=== Early career ===
Levy joined The New York Times as a news assistant in 1990 and was promoted to reporter in 1992. He served as chief of the Albany bureau as a political reporter, City Hall correspondent and Newark correspondent. Beginning in 2000, he was a special projects reporter for the Times' Metro desk. In 2002, he wrote a series "Broken Homes" on the abuse of mentally ill adults in state-regulated homes. In 2003, he won the Pulitzer Prize for investigative reporting, as well as the George Polk Award. He broke a story on New York State Medicaid fraud in 2005.

=== International reporting ===
Levy joined the international staff of the Times in 2006 as Moscow bureau chief. He received his second Pulitzer Prize in 2011 in the category of International Reporting for his reporting on corruption in Russia in cooperation with Ellen Barry. The jury cited their "dogged reporting that put a human face on the faltering justice system in Russia, remarkably influencing the discussion inside the country.". Shortly before, in March 2011, Levy was named deputy editor of the Times's Metro section.

=== Newsroom leadership roles ===
In 2013, two years after becoming an editor, Levy became the editorial lead on NYT Now, an app created by The Times that aimed to attract new readers by presenting a curated list of stories for a cheaper price than a full subscription. The Times made the app free in 2015 after acknowledging that it had failed to attract a significant number of new subscribers. In August 2016, the Times shelved the app.

Levy later was promoted to the masthead, serving as assistant managing editor and deputy managing editor, overseeing The Times's digital platforms. He led a number of initiatives to push the newsroom to embrace digital innovation and focus on digital audiences, including launching an experiment where editors and reporters were barred from viewing the desktop version of The Times inside the newsroom in order to get them to concentrate on mobile readers.

On at least two occasions, Levy was promoted into roles overseeing troubled parts of the Times. In 2018, he was named editor of the Metro section three months after the former editor, Wendell Jamieson, resigned following an internal investigation. In January 2021, Levy returned to the masthead as deputy managing editor, taking on a leadership role advising the audio department a month after the Times admitted to major errors in its flagship "Caliphate" podcast. One source told the New York Post that "Cliff was sent there to clean up the mess.”

Levy was reported to have been among several candidates to succeed Dean Baquet as executive editor, but did not receive the role, which went to managing editor Joe Kahn in April 2022.

After Kahn's promotion to executive editor, Levy remained on the Times's masthead as a deputy managing editor with a role said to focus on "ethical standards and journalistic independence, as well as training for editors throughout the newsroom."

On December 15, 2022, the Times announced that Levy would leave the newsroom and be appointed deputy publisher of the Wirecutter and The Athletic.

In 2024, The Washington Post and CNN both tried to recruit Levy to run their newsrooms. The New Yorker reported that Levy was the “top candidate” to become The Post’s executive editor, but he then pulled out of the process. Axios said Levy “withdrew from consideration for the top newsroom job over the paper's strategy.”

Axios reported that The Post’s publisher, William Lewis, who had been picked by owner Jeff Bezos, had failed to articulate a compelling vision for turning around The Post. Lewis later kept Matt Murray, interim executive editor, in the role, without making an announcement.

At the same time, CNN sought to hire Levy as part of its search for a “high profile” candidate to lead digital innovation in its newsroom, The Times reported.

=== Union negotiation controversy ===
Levy was Kahn's representative in controversial contract negotiations with the Times's union, which lasted for more than a two years after the union's contract expired in March 2021.

On December 7, 2022, Times journalists staged a one-day walk-out to protest what they said was the company's unwillingness to offer fair proposals, including on wages. It was the first such labor action since 2017 and the first to last a day or longer since 1978.

In late December 2022, it was reported that Levy would be appointed deputy publisher of The Athletic and Wirecutter, but that the move was "dependent on the pace of the labor talks." Insiders said the decision to move Levy from the newsroom to the business side was "in part recognition from publisher A.G. Sulzberger of Levy’s work dealing with the tense and drawn-out negotiations."

On May 23, 2023, the company and the union announced a deal for a new contract, ending more than two years of contentious negotiations, the Times reported. “This deal is a victory for all union members who fought for a fair contract,” the union said.

Levy said the contract "shows how much we value the contributions of NewsGuild members to The Times’s success.”

On June 6, 2023, the union said more than 99% of members had ratified the contract.

== Family ==
Levy is married to the documentary filmmaker Juliane Dressner. They have three children, Danya, Arden and Emmett, and live in Park Slope, Brooklyn. He is a member of the Park Slope Food Coop, where he serves as an editor of the Coop's Linewaiter's Gazette. In Park Slope, his children attended P.S. 321.

When Levy and his family lived in Moscow while he was a foreign correspondent, their children were enrolled in a local Russian school called the New Humanitarian School. He wrote about the experience for The New York Times Magazine, and Dressner produced and directed an accompanying short documentary for The Times's website that won a National Magazine Award.

== Awards ==
- 2012 National Magazine Award for Digital Media in Video for "My Family's Experiment in Extreme Schooling"
- 2011 Pulitzer Prize for International Reporting
- 2010 George Polk Award for Foreign Reporting
- 2009 Robert F. Kennedy Journalism Award
- 2003 Pulitzer Prize for Investigative Reporting for "Broken Homes"
- 2002 George Polk Award for Regional Reporting for "Broken Homes"
- 1998 George Polk Award for Local Reporting
