= Richard E. Lyon =

American illustrator (1913–2002)

Richard Eugene Lyon (1913 - 2002) was an American illustrator known for his magazine cover work and story illustrations. He was born and raised in Fort Scott, Kansas. In 1932 he spent a year of study at the Kansas City Art Institute in Kansas City, Missouri where he met R.G. Harris, Emery Clarke and John Falter. In 1933 they all moved to New Rochelle, New York, a northern suburb of Manhattan with a large community of prestigious illustrators. They opened a shared art studio at 560 Main Street where they worked to launch their respective careers as freelance illustrators.

Lyon had success selling freelance pulp covers to G-Men Detective, Texas Rangers, Thrilling Adventures, Thrilling Western, and Western Story Magazine. He eventually found work as an interior story illustrator for the major slick magazines such as Redbook and Cosmopolitan.

In 1941, before war was declared, he enlisted as a private in the National Guard. He served in the Coast Artillery Corps and Mine Planter Service during World War II. After the war he continued to paint illustrations for advertisements, as well as regular interior story illustrations for The Saturday Evening Post.

In 1951 he moved to Arlington, Virginia to work for the government. He married later married Mary-Alice Lyon and had three children. Richard Lyon died in Monterey on January 11, 2002 at the age of 89.
