= Luciano Lamonarca =

Italian musical artist (born 1978)

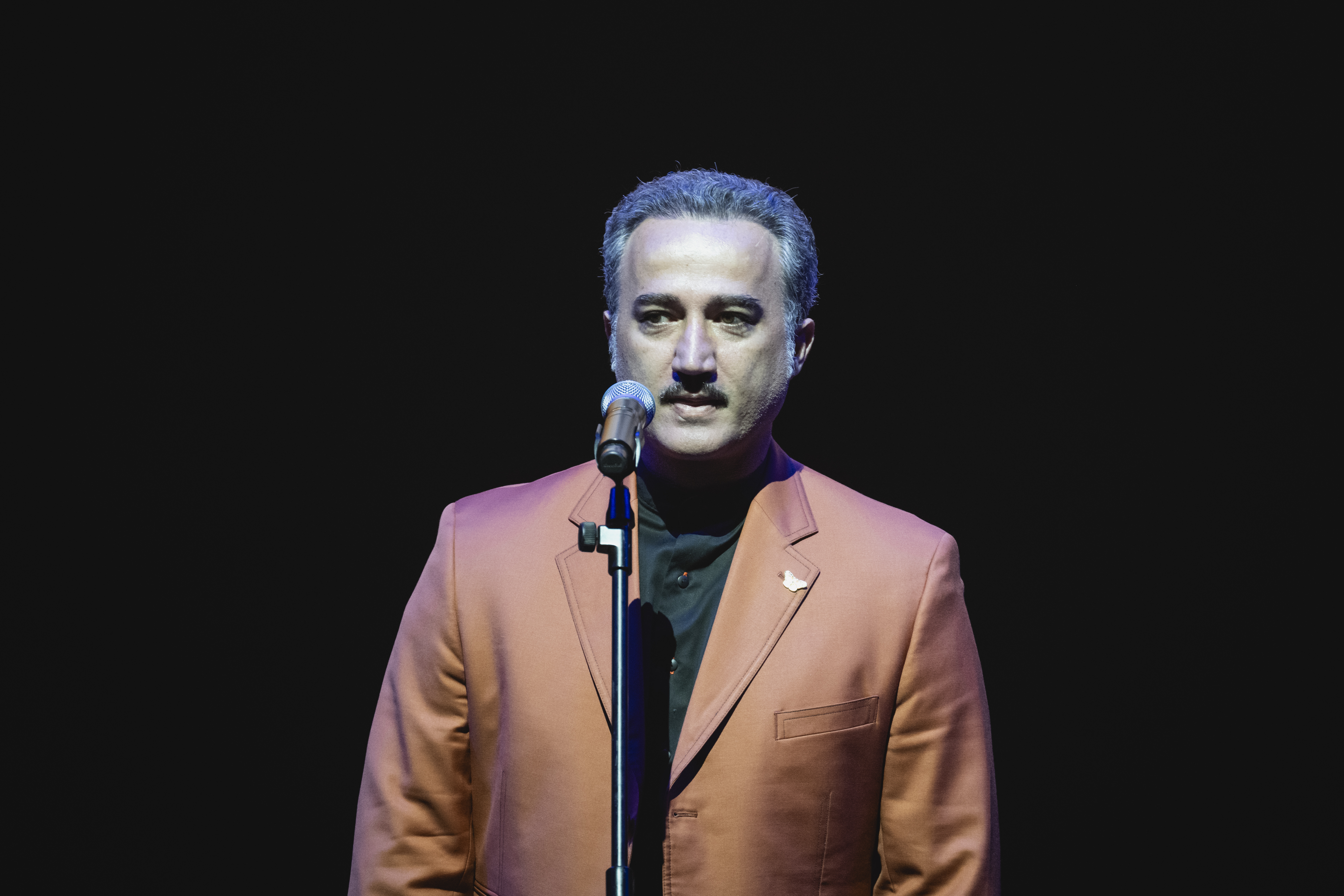
- Luciano Lamonarca during the Catholic Music Awards, in Rome, on July 27, 2025

Personal details
- Born: 11 August 1978 (age 47) Milan, Italy
- Occupation: Opera singer, crossover artist, event producer, philanthropist
- Website: lucianothemonarch.com
- Musical career
- Genres: Classical, pop operatic, pop

Luciano Lamonarca (born 11 August 1978), known professionally as Luciano the Monarch, is an Italian American opera singer, crossover artist, keynote speaker, philanthropist, and event producer. His tenor voice has resonated in some of the most prestigious international concert halls and venues, including Lincoln Center, Perelman Performing Arts Center, Carnegie Hall, Madison Square Garden, Liechtenstein Museum in Vienna, Dag Hammarskjold Auditorium, and many others. With his more than three hundred benefit event performances as of 2022, involvement in numerous charitable causes, and commitment to making art with a purpose, Lamonarca has earned the nickname "The Goodwill Tenor."

== Personal life and education ==
Luciano Lamonarca was born in Milan as the second and youngest son of Pasquale Lamonarca and Anna De Nicolo. His family later moved to Ruvo di Puglia in the southern Province of Bari, where he began his musical education.

Originally trained as a clarinetist, at age 18 he devoted himself to opera after hearing a recording of Mario Del Monaco's rendition of "Un amore così grande". From 1998 to 2008, he participated in several master classes conducted by Salvatore Fisichella, Roberto Scandiuzzi and Daniele Barioni, and he studied with Gino Lo Risso-Toma, Carmen Sensaud, and Ignazio Campisi.

In 2008, he moved to the United States.

== Artistic accomplishments ==
Among the first performances in the United States was that at New York's Madison Square Garden for the opening of the worldwide premiere of the movie Carnera: The Walking Mountain. Among the guests at that occasion were the American actor Burt Young and Academy Award winner F. Murray Abraham.

In April 2008, Lamonarca was selected as the European representative for a concert held at the United Nations General Assembly where he sang before an audience of ambassadors, delegations, President of the 62nd Session of the General Assembly H.E. Srgian Kerim, and Secretary-General Ban Ki-moon. Later in that same year, he performed with I Solisti del Teatro Regio di Parma at the Public Service Awards Ceremony, organized by the Department of Public Administration of the United Nations.

In March 2009, he performed in a concert titled "Mamma" at New York's Merkin Concert Hall. Then in 2010, he performed at New York's Lincoln Center in a concert that honored tenor Giovanni Consiglio, and again in December when he sang at Carnegie Hall's Weill Recital Hall in a concert-tribute to the United Nations Department of Peacekeeping Operations.

In 2011, at the tenth anniversary of the attack on the Twin Towers in Westchester County (New York), his featured performance was broadcast by News 12. In November of the same year, he was again the featured performer at "United Academia", a concert celebrating the first anniversary of United Nations Academic Impact.

In 2013, he returned to Merkin Concert Hall as a special performing guest of the United Nations Symphony Orchestra. In May, he performed for the first time in Chisinau, Moldova, at the prestigious Sala cu Orgă din Chișinău in a benefit concert, titled Sing for You, in support of the Regina Pacis Foundation.

From 2014 to 2017, he invested his energy and time in performing in multiple concerts and events in support of charitable causes. On December 7, 2018, he returned to Weill Recital Hall where he performed with the Four Phantoms (Brent Barrett, Ciarán Sheehan, Franc D'Ambrosio, and Marcus Lovett).

In December 2023 and in December 2024 he was a special performing guest of The United Nations Institute for Training and Research (UNITAR), opening the United Nations agency celebratory concerts both times at Carnegie Hall's Stern Auditorium / Perelman Stage.

In July 2025, Luciano the Monarch was awarded the "Best Male Singer (English)" prize at Catholic Music Awards 2025 at the Vatican for his performance of "The Song of Saint Pio," and in December 2025 he was bestowed the title of the first "Goodwill Ambassador" of the beloved Italian Christmas song "Tu Scendi dalle Stelle."

== Albums and digital projects ==
In March 2009, Lamonarca released his first album, titled Mamma, dedicated to his mother and launched in a concert at Merkin Concert Hall in New York. In January 2012, he released his second album, The Impossible Dream, a compilation of Italian operatic arias and American pop-operatic hits, made in partnership with the New York Choral Society. In October of the same year and with the approval of stage director Giancarlo del Monaco, he produced the online music project "Ricordando Mario Del Monaco" as a tribute to the legendary tenor Mario Del Monaco. In May 2018, he recorded the single "God Bless America" in partnership with the National Catholic Prayer Breakfast on the occasion of the 100th anniversary of its composition by Irving Berlin. That October, he recorded the single "Volare" on the 60th anniversary of its composition by Domenico Modugno. In May 2024, he released "The Song of Saint Pio", a reinterpretation of the same song composed by Rico Garofalo, in five different languages.

== Media credits ==
Lamonarca has been featured in numerous articles and interviews in The New York Times, The Wall Street Journal, New York Daily News, New York Post, Fox News, NBC, CBS, News 12, RAI Uno, RAI Tre, RAI International, The Italian Times, The Italian Tribune, Italia! magazine (in Russian), La Repubblica, America Oggi, Quotidiano.Net, and Il Corriere del Mezzogiorno.

== Public recognition ==
Lamonarca received a proclamation for artistic merit from the Westchester County Executive, Hon. Robert Astorino, on October 7, 2013, and from the New York State Comptroller, Hon. Thomas DiNapoli, on October 24, 2013. He also received a citation for artistic and philanthropic merit from New York City mayor Hon. Eric Adams on October 7, 2025.

== Philanthropy and other charitable projects ==
Because of his involvement in numerous charitable causes, his commitment to making art with a purpose, and having performed in more than three hundred benefit concerts and events in the span of a little over a decade, Lamonarca became known as the "Goodwill Tenor." In 2009, he donated part of the proceeds from the sales of his first album, Mamma, to the City of Hope in Zambia, a missionary project by Salesian Nuns to help orphan girls and victims of sexual abuse and domestic violence. A portion of the proceeds from his 2012 album The Impossible Dream was donated to the Mini Maestros Program, which enabled New York City public school students and their parents to attend New York Choral Society performances at Carnegie Hall at no cost.

He initiated, organized and performed in United for Abruzzo, an artistic tour of Manhattan, Staten Island, and Pennsylvania that raised funds for the victims of the earthquake in Abruzzo in 2009. In the spring of 2011 he introduced two philanthropic projects. The first, An Evening of Italian Opera Arias, was a gift of voice for cancer patients, families, and friends and a show of support for Musculoskeletal Cancer Research at Wintergarden and for Morgan Stanley Children's Hospital, at Columbia University Medical Center. The second was the concert Luciano Lamonarca and Friends, in April 2011, at Victor Borge Hall at the Scandinavia House, benefiting the Wyckoff Heights Medical Center.

In January 2025, he founded the public charitable organization "The People of Hope," which aims to provide practical initiatives to “bring hope and joy to others.”

Lamonarca has created and performed in numerous other artistic-philanthropic projects to benefit orphans and the poor from various communities and charitable organizations both in the United States and in foreign countries.

For his constant and tireless commitment to spreading Christian values through national and international performances, the Chamber of the Italian Parliament bestowed on him the first Christmas Award.

== Personal life ==
Luciano Lamonarca resides in Westchester County, NY, and became a US Citizen in November 2025.
