= New Humanitarian School =

- Новая гуманитарная школа

Location
- Krasnoarmejskaya st., 30”Б” 125319, Moscow, Russia; 125319, Российская Федерация, Москва, Красноармейская улица, д. 30 «Б» Russia
- Coordinates: 55°48′08″N 37°32′27″E

Information
- Type: Private school
- Website: school-1.ru

New Humanitarian School (NHS, Russian: Новая гуманитарная школа "Novaya Gumanitarnaya Shkola", НГШ) is a private primary and secondary school in Aeroport District, Northern Administrative Okrug, Moscow, Russia, with education from grades 1 through 11. It also offers a preparatory program for children of ages 4 and 5. Vasiliy Georgievich Bogin (Russian: Василий Георгиевич Богин) is the founder and current director of the school.

As of 2011, the school had small class sizes and about 150 students. In the school, students from all language backgrounds are taught exclusively in Russian and not in their native languages. Even though New Humanitarian is a private school, it is still heavily regulated by the Government of Russia.

Clifford J. Levy, a New York Times foreign correspondent, said "Bogin’s inability to renovate the building or find a bigger one reflects to some extent the establishment’s ambivalence toward his brilliance as an educational provocateur." In September 2007, Levy enrolled his children in the school. His children were among the first non-Russian students to attend the school.

== History ==
New Humanitarian School was established by Vasiliy Georgievich Bogin, the school's founder and current director. It was one of the first private schools in Russia. It was established in 1992, shortly after the fall of the Soviet Union.

== Education ==
Bogin promotes critical and abstract thinking, an opposite from the rote memorization promoted during the Soviet Union era. Classes are videotaped so that Bogin and the staff can discuss educational methodologies. Clifford J. Levy said that while the school in Brooklyn where his children previously attended had an "everyone’s-a-winner ethos" NHS had the message that "learning is hard, but you have to do it. You have to get good grades."

Levy as of 2011 the school is "still rooted in Russia’s educational and societal traditions." 4th grade students study algebra. The school regularly rates students older than the age of 9 by test scores and publicly posts these scores on a central wall. Students at NHS recite "Yevgeny Onegin" by Alexander Pushkin. According to Bogin, the school does not often admit non-native Russian speakers, and it hardly ever admits American students. Bogin told Levy that his children would be placed in the regular classes.

Some teachers stay during evenings to help students with projects and supervise them.

== Student body and faculty ==
As of 2012, the school has about 150 students and 80 teachers, with each class having 15 students. Some classes have two or three teachers.

Clifford J. Levy said that "the school was a strange breed" for Moscow citizens, and therefore it was not patronized by the majority of Moscow society. Levy added that the clientele tended to be upper middle-class parents who had a favorable reception to Bogin's methodology. As of around 2011 the school had about a US$10,000 (about $14312.13 when adjusted for inflation) per child per year tuition, making it too expensive for most Moscow citizens. Levy said that, at the same time, the school was "not appealing to the rich, who often preferred compliant teachers and lavish facilities."

According to Levy, the parents of students at the school "drove nice cars, lived in apartments that had been privatized in the post-Soviet era and vacationed in Western Europe." The parents of students in Levy's classes included architects, bankers, lawyers, publishers, professors, and a manufacturer of cosmetics. Levy said "I looked upon them as Russian versions of the parents who populate the Upper West Side, TriBeCa, or Park Slope."

== Facilities ==
Clifford J. Levy said that "New Humanitarian looked like an old annex to a public school in Queens." The school has narrow hallways and warped floors.
