= Stuart C. Lord =

American university president (born 1959)

5th President of Naropa University
- In office July 1, 2009 – December 31, 2012
- Preceded by: Thomas B. Coburn

Personal details
- Born: April 9, 1959 (age 67) New Rochelle, New York
- Education: Texas Christian University (A.B.); Princeton Theological Seminary (M.Div.); Princeton Theological Seminary (M.Th.); United Theological Seminary (D.Min.)
- Profession: University President

Stuart Calvin Lord (born April 9, 1959) is an American academic and administrator. In 2009 Lord became the fifth president of Naropa University. Lord was the first black president of Naropa University. Currently Lord serve as CEO and President of Delta Developmental, a firm in Boulder, CO, specializing in leadership development, curriculum design, organizational assessment, and consulting services working for businesses, athletic teams, and university executives

== Early life ==
Born in New Rochelle, New York in 1959 in foster care, Lord expressed an interest in community activism from an early age. Lord went on to attend Texas Christian University (TCU), receiving his Bachelor of Religious Studies and a minor in Sociology in 1982.

== Career ==
=== DePauw University ===
Lord went on to receive both his Master of Divinity and Master of Theology degrees from Princeton Theological Seminary in 1986 and 1987, respectively, and became the Assistant University Chaplain at DePauw University that same year. In 1988 Lord was appointed as the University Chaplain and in 1989 received the 'Outstanding Young Men of America' award.

Lord received his Doctor of Ministry degree from the United Theological Seminary in 1993 with a specialization in multicultural education. From 1993 to 2000 Lord, in addition to his primary duties, was assistant professor of University Studies and Director of the Bonner Scholars Program, both at DePauw University. Lord served as the University Chaplain until 1994 when he was appointed as Associate Dean of Academic Affairs, Director of Leadership Development and Service and Director of Volunteer Programs at DePauw University, these postings lasted until 1996.

In 1996, the Points of Light Foundation and the Corporation for National Service appointed Lord to serve as a one-year term as executive director of the President's Summit for America's Future, a national volunteer initiative targeted at improving the quality of life of America's youth. In 1997 Lord was appointed from Associate Dean of Academic Affairs to Associate Dean of DePauw University, in addition to executive director of the Grover L. Hartman Center at DePauw University. This posting lasted until 2000.

=== Dartmouth College ===
In 2000, Lord took the position of Dean of the Tucker Foundation and Associate Provost at Dartmouth College.

As associate provost, Lord worked on initiatives for institutional planning within the Provost Division to enhance staff development, retention and recruitment in support of diversity. He was appointed as Dartmouth's vice president for institutional diversity and equity on an interim basis for the 2007–08 academic year.

=== President of Naropa University ===
On March 2, 2009, Lord was announced to be the 5th President of Naropa University, a role he assumed on July 1, 2009.

=== Executive Director of Emergency Family Assistance Association ===
In May 2013, Lord was appointed the new executive director of the Emergency Family Assistance Association in Boulder, CO. He no longer serves in this capacity.
