= McGlone, West Virginia =

- Unincorporated community
- Location within West Virginia Location within the United States
- Coordinates: 37°31′15″N 80°29′29″W
- Country: United States
- State: West Virginia
- County: Monroe
- Elevation: 2,165 ft (660 m)
- Time zone: UTC-5 (Eastern (EST))
  - Summer (DST): UTC-4 (EDT)
- Area codes: 304 & 681
- GNIS feature ID: 1555086

McGlone is an unincorporated community in Monroe County, West Virginia, United States. McGlone is southeast of Union.
