= Alfred Dellentash =

Alfred Dellentash Jr.
- Born: August 19, 1948 (age 77); New Rochelle, New York, U.S.

Alfred Dellentash (Born August 19, 1948) is a former American music producer, private airline owner, and drug smuggler, who was involved in the large scale importation of marijuana during the 1980s.

Dellentash has been reluctant to discuss his criminal life saying "he keeps his past locked in a shadowy corner of his mind." In 2014 Dellentash was diagnosed with cancer, and it motivated him to reveal his story. As of 2016 Dellentash's stage-four cancer was in remission.

In September 2015 Fox Searchlight purchased the option to make a film of Dellentash's career based on Jeff Maysh's article The Man Who Got America High published by Narratively magazine. Lucas Ochoa and Thomas Benski were named as producers by Pulse Films.

== Early life ==
Dellentash was born in New Rochelle, New York. His father was a high-rise building contractor who worked on the construction of the World Trade Center. His mother was a pianist and was the head of the local Republican Party. Dellentash obtained his pilot’s license aged 16.

== Private jet companies ==
Between the late 1970s and early 1980s, Dellentash ran a number of multimillion-dollar private jet leasing companies, including ‘Triple-D Corporation’ and ‘IBEX Corp.’ According to a People magazine profile, his planes were furnished with ‘thick carpeting, plants, phones, telex printer, electric typewriter, bedroom and bar’. His clients included the Rolling Stones, the Grateful Dead, the Doobie Brothers, Kiss, Emerson, Lake and Palmer, and John Denver.

== Drug smuggling ==
Dellentash’s plane companies were a front for a major drug smuggling operation. In the book ‘Mob Star: The Story of John Gotti’, and in court documents, Dellentash is described as a ‘drugs partner’ to the New York City gangster Salvatore Ruggiero. He has since admitted to flying marijuana from Colombia to New York via the Bahamas, for the Gambino crime family.

== Music business ==
A successful music manager in the 1980s, Dellentash managed bands including Meat Loaf, the Bay City Rollers, and Whiplash. He partnered with producer David Sonenberg, to create the 1982 Meat Loaf movie 'Dead Ringer'. In his 2000 autobiography, Meat Loaf accused Dellentash of misappropriating funds, adding: “The music biz was just a sideline for Al…He would tell these stories of flying to Libya with a load of automatic weapons.”

== Plane crash ==
One of Dellentash’s planes, a Learjet, was responsible for the death of Salvatore Ruggiero and three others on May 6, 1982. The plane crashed into the ocean near Georgia, in what an FAA report described as "an uncontrolled descent from cruise altitude for undetermined reasons, from which a recovery was not or could not be effected". Shortly afterwards, according court documents, Dellentash "drove to Salvatore's house in New Jersey, meeting [John] Carneglia, Angelo Ruggiero, and Gene Gotti, whom they notified of Salvatore's death". The crash attracted the attention of the FBI, the FAA, and the Organized Crime Strike Force.

== Arrest and imprisonment ==
Dellentash was arrested and convicted in Baton Rouge in 1984, for conspiracy to distribute drugs. His case, number 1-83-907, was dismissed in the nineteenth judicial district court, Parish of East Baton Rouge, on November 26, 1984. He served just five years, having turned informant. It has been rumored that Dellentash entered the witness protection program, and had facial surgery to change his appearance, however a 2014 magazine profile disproved the surgery rumors.
