= Thomas B. Coburn =

American academic administrator

Thomas B. Coburn is a religious scholar, author, and a former president of Naropa University.

== Early life and education ==
Coburn grew up in Amherst, Massachusetts. He holds a BA from Princeton University, and a MTS and PhD in comparative religion from Harvard University.

== Career ==
Coburn served from 1996 to 2002 as the vice president of the university and dean of academic affairs at St. Lawrence University in Canton, New York. He was also the Charles A. Dana Professor of Religious Studies and had served on the faculty since 1974. From 2003–2009, Coburn was president of Naropa University. He also served as a faculty member in the graduate Religious Studies program, although he did not teach for the program during his tenure. Later, he was a visiting scholar at Brown University.

Coburn is an author specializing in South and East Asia and the Islamic world. He is considered one of the world's leading experts on the Hindu tradition of the great goddess, having written both Encountering the Goddess: A Translation of the Devi-Mahatmaya and a Study of Its Interpretation and Devi Mahatmya, The Crystallization of the Goddess Tradition. Coburn contributed to writings about the art of teaching in Leading from Within: Poetry that Sustains the Courage to Lead.

Coburn also spent time as the director of the New York State Independent College Consortium for Study in India, was a visiting faculty member on the University of Pittsburgh Semester at Sea program, and spent a year as a visiting scholar at the Harvard Divinity School.

== Books and articles published ==
- Coburn, Thomas B. Encountering the Goddess: A translation of the Devi-Mahatmya and a Study of Its Interpretation. State University of New York Press, 1991. (ISBN 0791404463)
- Devī Māhātmya, The Crystallization of the Goddess Tradition, South Asia Books, 2002. (ISBN 81-208-0557-7)
- Scripture' in India: Towards a Typology of the Word in Hindu Life, Journal of the American Academy of Religion, 42,3 (September 1984): 435–460.
