= Intermix (fashion) =

Women's fashion retailer

- Industry: Clothing; Fashion
- Founded: 1993
- Founder: Khajak Keledjian
- Headquarters: New York City, United States
- Key people: James Rushing (Interim CEO & CFO); Karen Katz (Former Interim CEO)
- Owner: Regent, L.P.
- Website: www.intermixonline.com

INTERMIX is an American women's fashion retailer with an omni-channel approach that was established in 1993 by Khajak and Haro Keledjian.

In addition to its own in-house designed collection, it also curates styles from various designers including Isabel Marant, Balmain, Ulla Johnson, Zimmermann, AGOLDE, Sika, Acne, and Nanushka. Around one-third of its offerings are exclusive to the brand.

On May 21, 2021, nine years after being sold to Gap Inc. for $130 million, it was acquired by the private equity firm Altamont Capital Partners. In November 2022, a year before closing seventeen of its stores, the New York City-based retailer was sold to Regent, L.P.
