= Henry C. Moses =

Dr. Henry Clay Moses (18 August 1941 – 16 April 2008) was an American educator. A teacher, college administrator, and school headmaster, he instituted important changes while the dean of freshmen at Harvard College and helped to lead Trinity School into its third century. A dedicated outdoorsman, he enjoyed running, cycling, backpacking, and mountain climbing.

== Early life ==
Born 18 August 1941 in Washington, D.C. to Henry C. Moses, a vice-president of the Mobil Oil corporation, and Barbara Frost Moses, he attended New Rochelle High School in New Rochelle, New York and then Princeton University (1963) and Cornell University (1968) with a PhD in English. He had two sisters: Margery Phillips and Catherine Barber.

== The Manhattanville years ==
From 1973 to 1977, Moses was dean of students and then vice president for student development at Manhattanville College in Purchase, New York. In addition to his administrative duties, he also taught a creative writing course.

== The Harvard years ==
Moses was the dean of freshmen at Harvard College from 1977 to 1991. There he was responsible for the academic and residential welfare of 1600 freshmen. He served as a member of faculty committees on admissions and financial aid, expository writing, advising and counseling, housing, and undergraduate life, Phillips Brooks House, and the administrative board of Harvard and Radcliffe Colleges. "Hank was a superb Harvard colleague: wise, funny, respectful of tradition but able to think out of the box, courageous, and kind," recalls the current Harvard College Dean of Freshmen Tom Dingman. "His analytical ability was sharp as was his capacity to understand and relate to students and faculty. During his tenure here he built a very strong staff and started programs like the Freshman Outdoor Program that have become critical to our success. Trinity's gain was our loss. Now we all will miss him."

While at Harvard Moses served on special committees and working groups on race relations, alcohol and drug abuse, death and dying, disciplinary reform, intercollegiate athletes, academic policies and procedures, academic assessment, and survey research.

As a lecturer in American literature at Harvard University (1980–1984), Moses taught a survey course in American literature, lectured on Mark Twain and Henry James, and created and taught an upperclassmen course on William Faulkner.

Moses served on both the faculties (lecturing in English) and in the dean's offices of Cornell University, Princeton University, and the University of Virginia. He was the dean of students (1973–1974) and then the vice-president for student development (1975–1977) at Manhattanville College, where he also taught several courses in the English Department.

== The Trinity School years ==
Moses became the twenty-seventh headmaster of Trinity School in New York City in 1991. He oversaw numerous improvements to Trinity's campus, including the construction of a new building to house the Middle School and two gymnasiums, as well as significant renovations throughout the School. New instructional, athletic, and administrative spaces were constructed and an historical archive was established in preparation for the School's 300th anniversary celebration in 2008–2009. Moses brought the school to a position of financial strength with an endowment that grew from $6 million when he arrived in 1991 to $51 million in 2007. Moses was a leader in building a diverse, inclusive, and committed Trinity community and was responsible for bringing and retaining a superb faculty at the School. Upon the announcement of his retirement—scheduled for June 2009 at the end of the School's tercentennial celebration—the trustees honored his years of service and dedication to bringing together a diverse community of students and teachers by creating the Henry C. Moses Financial Aid Endowment fund.

Moses, known as Hank to his friends and colleagues, brought a love of education and an enthusiasm for childhood and teaching to his work at the School. "He was my best friend in New York," recalls Jake Dresden headmaster of Concord Academy and former headmaster of Collegiate School in New York. "A colleague and a counselor, a wise voice of experience, a man of integrity, a man of humor, a family man, a tough and compassionate friend of students and faculty. At a New York Association of Independent Schools conference—during which we mostly played hooky and rode our mountain bikes on the old carriage trails of Mohonk—we shared our histories, our likes and dislikes, and became good friends. While I am heartbroken about his passing, I know he lived a very good life, filled with love from his family and friends and admiration from his colleagues. Trinity School was wise to hire Hank in the same year that I came to Collegiate and to have him for seventeen years, helping to make the school strong and vibrant."

At Freshmen Orientation he asked the ninth grade students to write what they hoped to have accomplished by the time they had graduated from Trinity. At the Senior Retreat he asked the graduating twelfth graders to write about their experiences at the School and to describe their impressions of the place. He treasured these notes from the beginning and end of each student's time in the Upper School and he pored over them to find inspiration to improve the work of the School. He sought to strengthen the students' connection to Trinity Church, Wall Street—where the School was founded in 1709—by establishing events at the church: a matriculation event for the freshmen and a baccalaureate for the graduating seniors. Throughout his tenure at the School he sought to connect to every member of the community and to enhance their lives by reaching out to the larger world.

Frequently asked to consult on education issues, over the years Moses worked with students, faculty, counselors, parents, and trustees at secondary schools and colleges including Phillips Academy Andover, Brown University, Dalton School, Drew University, Harvard Summer Institute on College Admissions, The Nightingale-Bamford School, Oxford Enrichment Program, and U.C. Berkeley. He is the author of Inside College: New Freedom, New Responsibility (College Board, 1990).

== Family ==
Moses' first marriage was to Jean Smith and with whom he had three children: James Moses, Bruce Moses, and Paige Lewin. That marriage ended in divorce. In 1986, he married Mary Sarah Holland and they had two children: Laurence Henry Moses Holland and William Frederick Moses Holland.
