= John J. McGlone =

American animal scientist

- Born: October 27, 1955 (age 70); New Rochelle, New York, U.S.
- Education: UIUC
- Children: 2 daughters, Molly McGlone and Kerry McGlone Falwell
- Awards: ASAS Animal Management Award
- Scientific career
- Workplaces: Texas Tech University
- Doctoral advisor: Stan Curtis; Ed Banks

John J. McGlone (born October 27, 1955) is an American animal scientist and a Frank Guggenheim Fellow, Institutional Official Director and professor of Animal Science at Texas Tech University.

== Early life and education ==
McGlone grew up in the New York City area and on Long Island, New York. He graduated from Holy Family High School in Huntington, New York. He received his B.S. and his M.S. in 1977, and in 1979 in Animal Science with a minor in Neuroscience at Washington State University. He completed his Ph.D. in 1981 in Animal Science with a minor in Neural and Behavioral Biology from University of Illinois. He was a research professor in animal science at University of Wyoming before moving to Texas Tech University.

== Research and academic contributions ==
McGlone is known for his research and contributions in (a) the use of pheromones to alter farm animal and companion animal behavior, (b) the welfare of transport in pigs, (c) housing and care of sows (adult pigs), and (d) sustainable pork production systems.

McGlone has published over 150 original refereed publications including papers, book chapters, abstracts and technical reports. He has been invited to speak in the US, Europe, Latin America, Asia, and Australia on animal behavior, welfare, and management. He is frequently quoted in the news as an expert on farm animal behaviour.

McGlone has been granted more than $4.8 million research funding. He started a company, Farm Animal Care Training and Auditing, which was sold to Frost in 2012.

== Honors and awards ==
- 1992: ASAS Animal Management Award
- 2010: Chair of Federation of Animal Science Societies (FASS) Animal Care and Use Committee
- 1990: Presidential Academic Achievement Award at TTU
- 1992: Outstanding Researcher at College of Agricultural Science at TTU
- 1983 and 1984: Harry Frank Guggenheim Research Fellowship Award

== Books ==
John J. McGlone co-authored a book with Pond, Wilson G titled Pig Production: Biological Principles and Applications (ISBN 9780827384842). This book is widely used as a textbook.
