= Parsonage pear =

Edible fruit cultivar

Pear 'Parsonage'
- Genus: Pyrus
- Species: Pyrus communis
- Cultivar: 'Parsonage'
- Origin: New Rochelle, New York, USA

The Parsonage is a cultivar of the European Pear (Pyrus communis) which is a native of New Rochelle, New York in northeastern United States. The pear tree, found on the parsonage of Reverend Doctor R. U. Morgan, rector of Trinity Episcopal Church, was introduced as the Parsonage pear in 1857 by Stephen P. Carpenter of the Huguenot Nurseries of New Rochelle. The original tree was a constant and abundant bearer of fruit which was viewed as flavorful and of very good quality.

During its early years, New Rochelle was well known for the propagation of trees and shrubbery. The Huguenot settlers were especially skilled in the development of fruits and flowers. The 'Churchland' and 'Huntington' pear varieties are also native to the community, as well as the Lawton blackberry, the first widely cultivated blackberry in the country.

== Characteristic features ==
The 'Parsonage' Pear is of large size, approximately 3 1/4 inches in length by 2 1/2 inches wide. It is pyriform in shape, rounded at the base and often long and turbinate. The skin is yellow in color, with a russet-ed base and crown, and russet markings interspersed across the remaining exterior portions. The stem is 5/8 of an inch long and its flesh is rather granular in texture and buttery. The 'Parsonage' ripens to maturity around the end of September.
