= Churchland pear =

Pear cultivar

Pear 'Churchland'
- Genus: Pyrus
- Species: Pyrus communis
- Cultivar: 'Churchland'
- Origin: New Rochelle, New York, USA

The Churchland or Church is a cultivar of the European pear (Pyrus communis), it was developed in New Rochelle, New York in northeastern United States. It is believed to have originated as a seedling raised by one of the early Huguenot settlers of the village in the late 17th century. The original tree stood on land which was owned by the Trinity St. Paul's Church of New Rochelle, hence the naming of the fruit "Church". The fruit was so luscious that it was universally liked and, by grafting, the tree soon had extensive propagation throughout the country. An early account of the tree appeared in the proceedings of the American Pomological Society in 1856.

During its early years, New Rochelle was well known for the propagation of trees and shrubbery. The Huguenot settlers were especially skilled in the development of fruits and flowers. The 'Parsonage' and 'Huntington' pear varieties are also native to the community, as well as the 'Lawton Blackberry', the first widely cultivated blackberry in the country.

== Characteristic features ==
The 'Church' Pear is of medium size, approximately 2 to 3 inches in length by 2 1/3 inches wide, and is largest in the middle and tapers both ways. The skin is greenish-yellow in color, russet-ed at the base and crown, with occasionally russet markings on other portions of the exterior. The stem is approximately 1 and three eighths inches long and of a cinnamon color. Its flesh is fine in texture and buttery, and it has a mild flavor. It commences ripening about the middle of July, and continues till the end of September.
