= Huntington pear =

Edible fruit cultivar

'Huntington' pear
- Genus: Pyrus
- Species: Pyrus communis
- Cultivar: 'Huntington'
- Breeder: James P. Huntington
- Origin: New Rochelle, New York, USA

The Huntington is a cultivar of the European Pear (Pyrus communis) and is a native of New Rochelle, New York in northeastern United States. The original pear tree was found in the woods by James P. Huntington when still small and was transplanted to his yard on Main Street in the center of town. In 1856, when the tree was about 20 years of age, it was introduced by Stephen P. Carpenter of the Huguenot Nurseries of New Rochelle.

During its early years, New Rochelle was well known for the propagation of trees and shrubbery. The Huguenot settlers were especially skilled in the development of fruits and flowers. The 'Churchland' and 'Parsonage' pear varieties are also native to the community, as well as the Lawton blackberry, the first widely cultivated blackberry in the country.

== Characteristic features ==
The Huntington pear is of medium size with a stout and slightly inclined shape. The skin is greenish-yellow in color, with a very distinct russet crown, and russet markings interspersed across the entire exterior but more-so at the base. The pear maintains quite well, keeping long after turning over to a bright yellow or orange. Its flesh is white and juicy with a particularly refreshing flavor. The Huntington ripens to maturity around the end of September to first week of October.
