= St. John's Wilmot Church (New Rochelle, New York) =

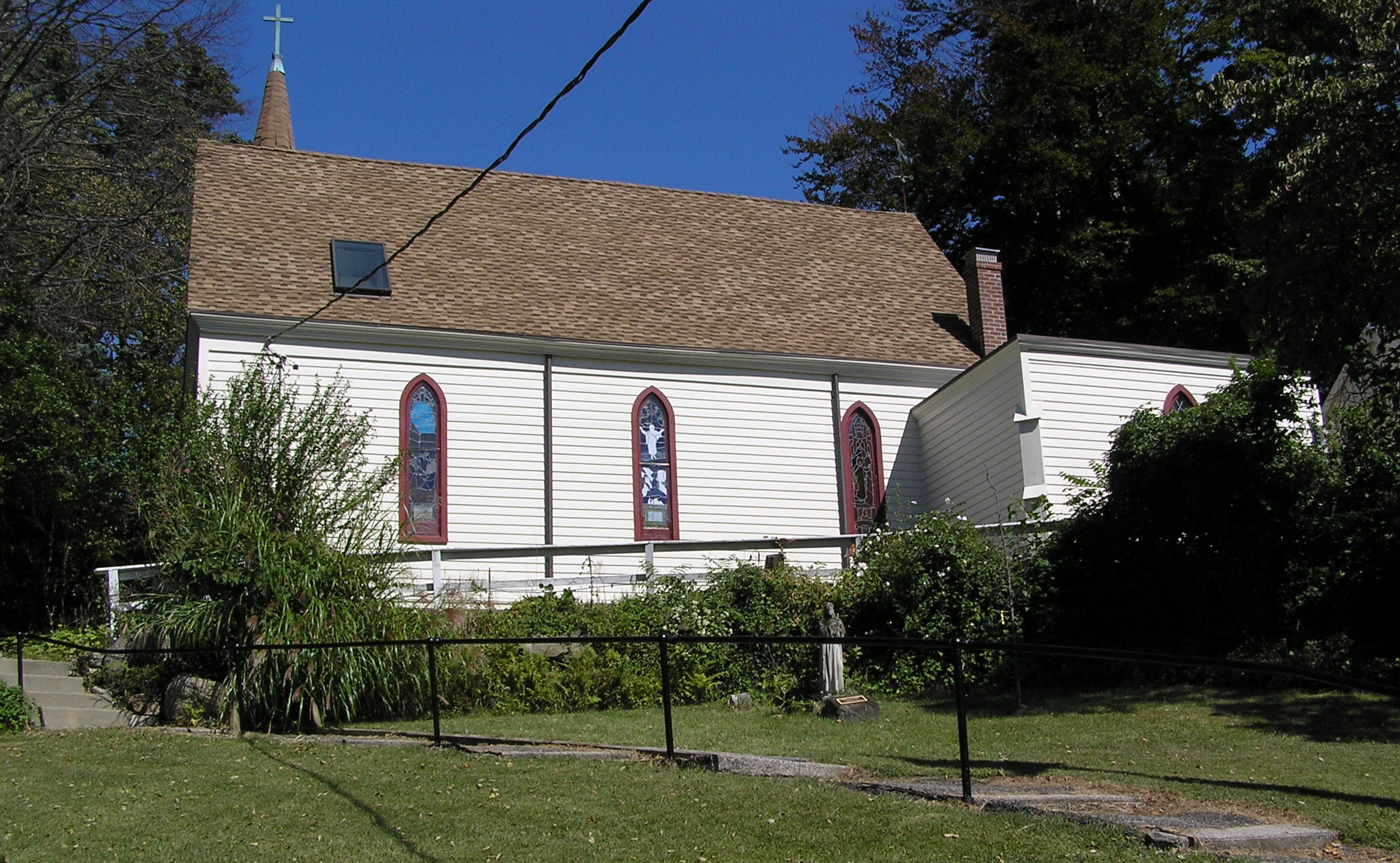
- St. John's Wilmot Church
- 40°57′16″N 73°47′47″W
- Location: New Rochelle, New York, U.S.
- Denomination: Episcopal Church

History
- Founded: May 1, 1858

St. John's Wilmot Church is an Episcopal parish in New Rochelle, New York. Located at the intersection of North Avenue, Mill Road and Wilmot Road, the church anchors the 17th - 19th century satellite hamlet of Cooper's Corners.

Officially founded on May 1, 1858, the Alexander Durand designed Carpenter Gothic church was completed in 1859 to serve as a chapel of ease for people who found it too difficult to travel five miles to Trinity Church on Huguenot Street in the southern part of town and St. James-the-Less in Scarsdale. Soon it was an independent church, incorporated under the laws of New York State December 8, 1860, serving parishioners in the northern reaches of New Rochelle and beyond. The church is built on a foundation of Tuckahoe marble, while the building's interior retains such original details as 19 mahogany pews and chandeliers.

St. John's was the location of the first public school in New Rochelle. It was established under the provisions of the Act of April 9, 1795, the first public school law passed by the State of New York. The school house was built between 1830 and 1840, replacing an original single room school built in 1795. In 1922, the New Rochelle School Board transferred its students to the Roosevelt School. The Church purchased the property in 1943 for use as a Sunday school and clergy offices.

Artist Norman Rockwell was a member of the St. John's congregation. His children were baptized in the church.

The Rev. Jennie Talley was called as the 20th rector of St. John's on June 5, 2016, and is its first woman rector.
