= Cooper's Corners =

Section of New Rochelle, New York, U.S.

Coordinates: 40°57′16.4″N 73°47′49″W

Cooper's Corners is a historic section of the city of New Rochelle in Westchester County, New York. For over two centuries Cooper's Corners served as an outpost for residents who lived in rural 'Upper New Rochelle', an area miles from the business center of town.

The hamlet took shape at North Avenue and Mill Road near the Hutchinson River, and grew to include ‘Burtis Mill’, John Cooper’s General Store, the Coopers Corners School, St. John's Wilmot Church, and the Wilmot Fire Station No. 6.

When a 1795 act of state legislature provided the first funding for public schools, one of the first three schools established in the community was the Cooper's Corners School. Children living in the very northern sections of New Rochelle and neighboring Eastchester attended school in the one-room building until 1920 when Roosevelt School was constructed in the newly developing Wykagyl area. The building is currently used as a private nursery school.

Twenty families attended the first service in the newly built St. John's Wilmot Church in February, 1860. They had previously walked over five miles from their farms in Upper New Rochelle to attend services at Trinity Church in the heart of downtown. St. John's Church is now the oldest extant house of worship in New Rochelle, having been completed in 1859 at the corner of North Avenue and Wilmot Road.

In 1894 the reservoir Lake Innisfree was constructed by the New Rochelle Water Company along the hamlets northern border. Much of the surrounding forest and farmland was also purchased for use as a watershed for the lake which became the primary water supply source for Upper Rochelle during late 19th & early 20th centuries.

In 1901 Adrian G Iselin provided funds to build the Wilmot Fire Station at the southwest corner of Wilmot Road, North Avenue and Mill Road. Now a private residence, the Wilmot Fire Station was replaced by station No.5 which was built at the end of Pinebrook Boulevard in 1950.

== Mills ==
The mill at the crossing of the Hutchinson River by the Mill Road from Cooper's Corner, New Rochelle, to Eastchester, began as an enterprise of Colonel Caleb Heathcote, Lord of Scarsdale Manor. In 1696 an agreement for the erection of mills on the Hutchinson River was entered into between Heathcote and the inhabitants of the Town of Eastchester.

An earlier mill, which was both a saw and grist-mill, was on the Eastchester side of the river and south of the road. The present Mill Road was not established on its present route through New Rochelle until 1764.

It is unknown when exactly the second mill was built and for how long it was operated by Heathcote, as there are no records available until his death which occurred suddenly on March 1, 1721. It later came under the ownership of Gilead Hunt, who operated the mill for many years, including the Revolutionary War period, and until the year 1785, when he disposed of it to Ebenezer S. Burling. The latter sold it to Ramson Burtis in 1793. Hunt was a son of Moses Hunt of East Chester and, for a time, he was also the proprietor of the 'lower mill' on the Hutchinson River near Union Corners. The next owner of the upper mill was Andrew Smith, after whom it passed to James W. Tompkins, and, later, to Seaman Burtis, remaining in the Burtis family for many years. Gun carriages were manufactured at Burtis Mill during the Civil War for use in the Union Army.

== See also ==
- GNIS Detail
- NY Hometown Locator – Coopers Corners
