= List of mayors of New Rochelle, New York =

Heads of the executive branch of New Rochelle

Mayor of New Rochelle
- Incumbent; Yadira Ramos-Herbert since January 1, 2024
- Style: The Honorable
- Term length: 4 years
- Formation: 1899

This is a list of mayors of the City of New Rochelle in the State of New York.

Mayors
No.	Name	Term	Party	Ref.
1	Michael Dillon	1899–1901	Democratic	
2	Henry S. Clarke	1902–1907	Republican	
3	George G. Raymond	1908–1909	Democratic	
4	Harry E. Colwell	1910–1911	Republican	
5	Frederick H. Waldorf	1912–1913	Democratic	
6	Edward Stetson Griffing	1914–1917	Republican	
7	Frederick H. Waldorf	1918–1919	Democratic	
8	Harry Scott	1920–1925	Republican	
9	Benjamin B. Badeau	1926–1929	Republican	
10	Walter G. C. Otto	1930–1934	Democratic	
11	Paul M. Crandell	1934–1935	Republican	
12	Charles F. Simmons	1935	Republican	
13	Harry Scott	1935–1940	Republican	
14	Stanley W. Church	1940–1955	Democratic	
15	George Vergara	1956–1959	Independent	
16	Stanely W. Church	1960–1963	Democratic	
17	Alvin R. Ruskin	1964–1970	Republican	
18	Stanley W. Church	1970	Democratic	
19	Frank J. Garito	1971–1975	Republican	
20	Vincent R. Rippa	1976–1979	Democratic	
21	Leonard C. Paduano	1980–1991	Republican	
22	Timothy C. Idoni	1992–2005	Democratic	
23	Noam Bramson	2006–2023	Democratic	
24	Yadira Ramos-Herbert	2024–present	Democratic	
