= Northern Dutchess Paramedics =

Northern Dutchess Paramedics (NDP)
- Motto: "Every Call is a Chance to Make a Difference"
- Established: 1994 - 2025
- Headquarters: Rhinebeck, New York
- Jurisdiction: Northern Dutchess County (NY), Southern Columbia County (NY), and Western Litchfield County (CT)
- Employees: 140 providers
- BLS or ALS: ALS and BLS
- Ambulances: 18 Ambulances, 3 Fly-Cars
- Medical director: David Templeton, MD
- Responses: 15,000 per year
- Website: http://www.ndpems.com

Northern Dutchess Paramedics (NDP) was an advanced life support (ALS) and basic life support (BLS) ambulance service headquartered in Rhinebeck, New York. NDP operated ambulances staffed by emergency medical technicians (EMTs) and paramedics. NDP held multiple 9-1-1 EMS contracts in Dutchess County, Columbia County and Litchfield County. Within Dutchess, Columbia, and Litchfield counties, NDP had been assigned a department ID number of "84".

== History ==
NDP was founded in 1994 by paramedics Edward Murray and Robert Latimer and was New York State's first licensed, stand alone advanced life support first response service. Since then the company expanded to advanced life support services, as well as basic life support services and ambulance and inter-facility transport. Outside of the response mode, NDP offered EMS continuing education, first aid and safety training for the community and classes for allied health professionals.

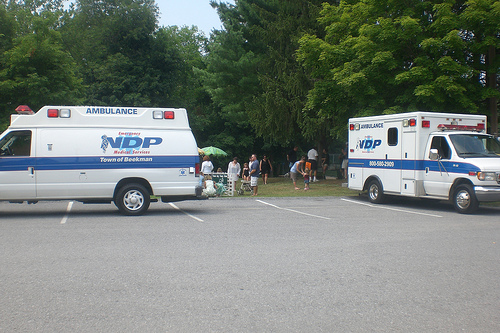
Two NDP Ambulances; 84-75 & 84-82 on standby at the Beekman Community Day.

=== Alamo/NDP merger ===
On December 14, 2007, NDP announced a proposed merger with Alamo EMS, whose parent company is Health Quest, the largest health care system in the Hudson Valley. The application was the first step in the regulatory process toward creating an organization which was aimed at better serving the Hudson Valley community in providing emergency and ambulance services. The joint venture also required approval from the New York State Attorney General’s Office and the New York State Supreme Court. Health Quest and Northern Dutchess Paramedics anticipated that the regulatory process would take approximately six to twelve months. However, on December 17, 2008, the two companies announced that the merger had fallen through, and would not be completed. The companies claimed they had differences that could not be settled. If merged, it would have been the largest independent ambulance provider in the Hudson Valley Region.

=== Loss of contracts ===
On November 21, 2008, at 5:30 pm, NDP officially lost its ALS contract for the towns of Beekman and Pawling, for failure to have an official Certificate of Need (CON). Alamo EMS resumed operations in the two towns. NDP claims the loss of the CON was no fault of theirs and that the responsibility lies with the town boards of Pawling and Beekman. In mid-November, it had been discovered that the New York State Department of Health had never issued NDP a CON for Southern Dutchess County and NDP should never have been allowed to operate in that area without the CON.

=== Ambulette Division ===
NDP operated an ambulette division consisting of 6 multipassenger wheelchair vans. This division was formed in 1998 to meet the needs of facilities served by the agency. In 2016, shortly after the loss of a major contract, the division was disbanded due to decreased revenue.

Empress EMS Acquisition of NDP

On August 26th, 2025, it was announced that Empress EMS and NDP had entered a purchase agreement, and that Empress would be acquiring all of NDP's assets and 9-1-1 ambulance contracts sometime in September of that year. This marked the end to NDP's operation as a 9-1-1 ambulance service provider after operating for nearly 31 years.
