= Noam Bramson =

American politician

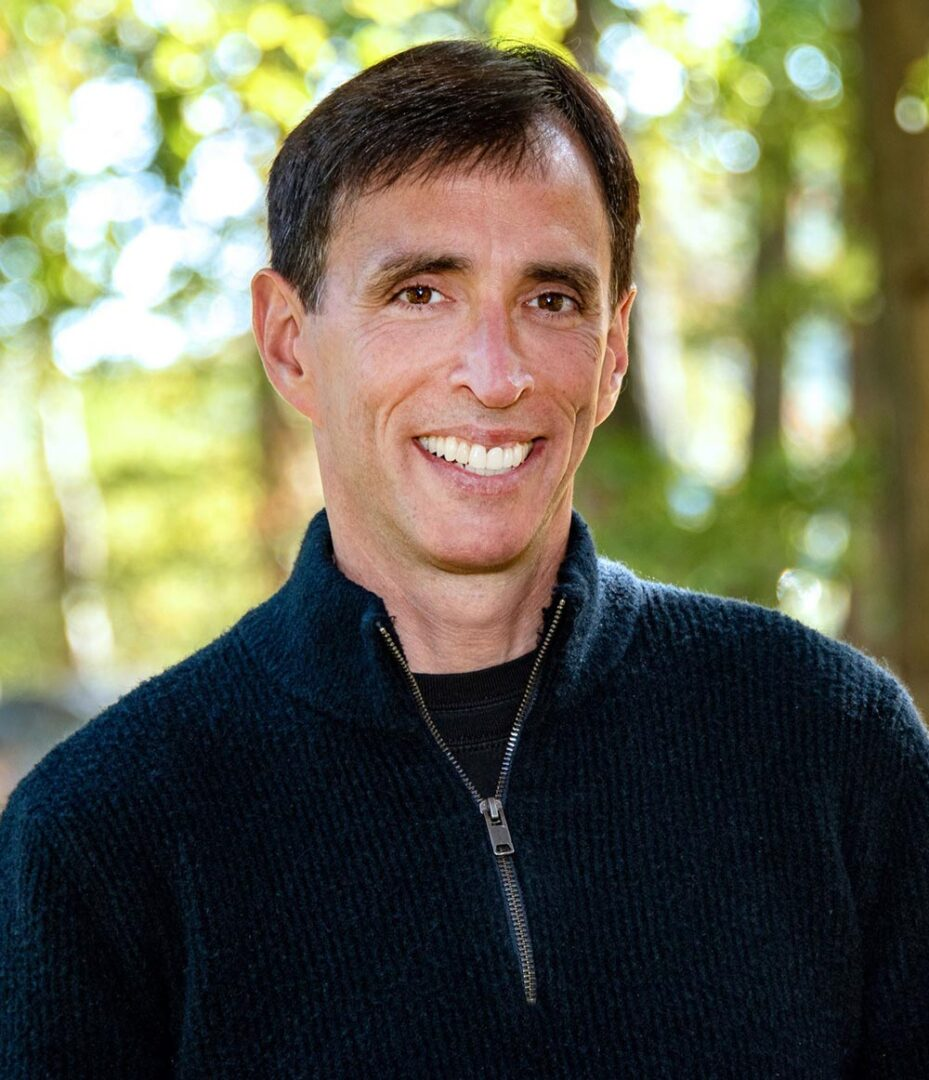

Mayor of New Rochelle
- In office January 1, 2006 – December 31, 2023
- Preceded by: Timothy C. Idoni
- Succeeded by: Yadira Ramos-Herbert

Member of the New Rochelle City Council from the 5th district
- In office January 1, 1996 – December 31, 2005
- Succeeded by: Barry R. Fertel

Personal details
- Born: December 13, 1969 (age 56) New Rochelle, New York, U.S.
- Party: Democratic
- Spouse: Catherine Stern (m. 2002)
- Children: 2
- Education: Harvard University (BA, MPA)
- Website: Official website Campaign website

Noam Bramson (born December 13, 1969) is an American politician from the state of New York. He was the mayor of New Rochelle, New York, appointed in January 2006 to complete the unexpired term of Mayor Timothy C. Idoni. Bramson was reelected in 2011 with 79% of the vote.

Prior to becoming mayor, Bramson served for ten years on the New Rochelle City Council as a representative of the Fifth City District. In 2013 Bramson was nominated by the Westchester County Democratic Party to be its candidate for Westchester County Executive against incumbent Republican Rob Astorino.

== Early life and education ==
Bramson was born to a Jewish family in New Rochelle, New York. He is a first-generation American. Bramson's Polish-born parents were refugees during World War II who met in Israel in the 1950s, married, and moved to the United States.

In 1987, Bramson went to Harvard University, where he completed his undergraduate degree in three years, and then received a master's degree in Public Policy. Bramson was chosen to give a student address at his Harvard's commencement in 1990.

== Political career ==
From 1992 until 2012, Bramson served as a political consultant and speechwriter for Rep. Nita Lowey. Bramson served on the Boards of numerous civic organizations, including the New Rochelle Campership Fund, the Castle Gallery, the New Rochelle Fund for Educational Excellence, the New Rochelle Council of Community Services, the Westchester Jewish Council, and the United Way of New Rochelle.

=== City Council ===
Bramson returned to New Rochelle after college in 1995, and at the age of 25, was elected to New Rochelle City Council. He won his subsequent election bids in 1999 and 2003, garnering more than 70 percent of the vote.

=== 2002 Assembly challenge ===
In 2002, Bramson challenged longtime Democratic Assemblyman Ron Tocci. Bramson won the Democratic primary with 61% of the vote. Tocci switched parties, winning against Bramson in the general election as the Republican Party candidate with 53% of the vote.

=== Mayor ===
In January 2006, Bramson was appointed to a one-year term as mayor to complete the unexpired term of Timothy Idoni. Bramson won a special election in November 2006 for Mayor. In 2007, Bramson won his first full four-year term and was re-elected in 2011 with 79% of the vote.

Bramson is a member of the Mayors Against Illegal Guns Coalition, a bipartisan group. He has been an advocate of thoughtful community, and regional planning. He led the creation of New Rochelle's first Sustainability Plan, promoted efforts to establish new public access to the Long Island Sound shore, and adopted new land use policies to preserve open space and protect neighborhoods from overdevelopment. Bramson has secured grants for critical infrastructure priorities, including the enhancement of major transportation corridors and the rehabilitation of New Rochelle's playing fields.

=== 2013 race for County Executive ===
On April 25, 2013, Bramson defeated Westchester County Board of Legislators Chairman Ken Jenkins of Yonkers and Legislator Bill Ryan of White Plains to become the Democratic Party's nominee for the county's top office. He faced Republican County Executive Rob Astorino in the November 2013 election and lost in the general election.

== Personal life ==
Bramson married Catherine ("Catie") Stern, Ph.D., a pediatric neuropsychologist, on May 12, 2002. They have two sons.

== Electoral history ==
New Rochelle City Council 5th District, 1995 General Election
Party	Candidate	Votes	%
Republican	Katharine Wilson Conroy	1,306	44.02%
Huguenots	Katharine Wilson Conroy	57	1.92%
Total	Katharine Wilson Conroy (incumbent)	1,363	45.94%
Democratic	Noam Bramson	1,594	53.72%
Right to Life	Joseph C. Masdew	10	0.34%
Total votes		2,967	100.00
Majority		231	7.78%
Democratic gain from Republican			

New Rochelle City Council 5th District, 1999 General Election
Party	Candidate	Votes	%
Republican	Michael Raskas	543	20.03%
Independence	Michael Raskas	87	3.21%
Total	Michael Raskas	630	23.24%
Democratic	Noam Bramson (incumbent)	1,996	73.62%
Right to Life	Edward D. Ryan	85	3.14%
Total votes		2,711	100.00
Majority		2,104	49.28%
Democratic hold			

New York State Assembly 91st District, 2002 Democratic Primary Election
Party	Candidate	Votes	%
Democratic	Noam Bramson	3,395	62.86%
Democratic	Ronald C. Tocci (incumbent)	2,006	37.14%
Total votes		5,401	100.00
Majority		1,389	25.72%

New York State Assembly 91st District, 2002 General Election
Party	Candidate	Votes	%
Republican	Ronald C. Tocci	13,080	43.49%
Independence	Ronald C. Tocci	1,316	4.38%
Conservative	Ronald C. Tocci	1,178	3.92%
Working Families	Ronald C. Tocci	317	1.05%
Total	Ronald C. Tocci (incumbent)	15,891	52.84%
Democratic	Noam Bramson	14,787	45.84%
Right to Life	Catherine T. Naughton	396	1.32%
Total votes		30,074	100.00
Majority		2,104	7.00%
Republican gain from Democratic			

New Rochelle City Council 5th District, 2003 General Election
Party	Candidate	Votes	%
Republican	Jason R. Isanberg	711	22.60%
Conservative	Jason R. Isanberg	93	2.96%
Independence	Jason R. Isanberg	104	3.30%
Total	Jason R. Isanberg	908	28.86%
Democratic	Noam Bramson	2,238	71.34%
Total votes		3,146	100.00
Majority		1,330	42.28%
Democratic hold			

New Rochelle Mayor, 2007 General Election
Party	Candidate	Votes	%
Democratic	Noam Bramson	6,901	63.99%
Working Families	Noam Bramson	316	2.93
Total	Noam Bramson (incumbent)	7,217	66.92%
Republican	Michael Brown	2,946	27.32%
Independence	Michael Brown	618	5.73%
Total	Michael Brown	3,564	33.05%
Turnout		10,784	29.65%
Majority		3,653	33.87%
Democratic hold			

New Rochelle Mayor, 2011 General Election
Party	Candidate	Votes	%
Democratic	Noam Bramson	8,003	74.45%
Working Families	Noam Bramson	528	4.91%
Total	Noam Bramson (incumbent)	8,531	79.36%
Republican	Richard St Paul	1,613	15.00%
Conservative	Richard St Paul	344	3.20%
Independence	Richard St Paul	307	2.09%
Total	Richard St Paul	2,182	20.30%
Turnout		10,750	26.60%
Majority		6,349	59.06%
Democratic hold			

Westchester County Executive, 2013 General Election
Party	Candidate	Votes	%
Democratic	Noam Bramson	74,964	40.97%
Working Families	Noam Bramson	2,907	1.59%
Independence	Noam Bramson	2,491	1.36%
Total	Noam Bramson	80,362	43.92%
Republican	Rob Astorino	88,645	48.45%
Conservative	Rob Astorino	13,860	16.71%
Total	Rob Astorino (incumbent)	102,505	56.03%
Turnout		182,955	33.08%
Majority		22,143	12.10%
Republican hold			

New Rochelle Mayor, 2015 General Election
Party	Candidate	Votes	%
Democratic	Noam Bramson	5,382	57.94%
Working Families	Noam Bramson	251	2.70%
Women's Equality	Noam Bramson	83	0.89%
Total	Noam Bramson (incumbent)	5,716	61.54%
Independence	James O'Toole	3,548	38.20%
Turnout		9,288	22.63%
Majority		2,168	23.34%
Democratic hold			

New Rochelle Mayor, 2019 General Election
Party	Candidate	Votes	%
Democratic	Noam Bramson	8,484	60.4%
Working Families	Noam Bramson	345	2.46%
Total	Noam Bramson (incumbent)	8,829	62.86%
Republican	Brendan Conroy	4,308	30.67%
Conservative	Brendan Conroy	583	4.15%
Independence	Brendan Conroy	307	2.18%
Total	Brendan Conroy	5,198	37.01%
Turnout		14,046	31.34%
Majority		3,361	25.85%
Democratic hold			

Political offices
Preceded by Timothy C. Idoni	23rd Mayor of New Rochelle; 2006–present	Incumbent
