= Timothy C. Idoni =

Mayor of New Rochelle, New York

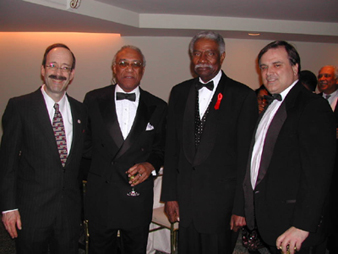
- Idoni, on the right, with Congressman Eliot Engel, Mount Vernon Mayor Ernie Davis, and Ossie Davis in 2003

Westchester County Clerk
- In office January 2, 2006 – January 1, 2026
- County Executive: Andrew Spano; Rob Astorino; George Latimer
- Preceded by: Leonard Spano
- Succeeded by: Thomas Roach

Mayor of New Rochelle
- In office January 1, 1991 – December 31, 2005
- Preceded by: Leonard Paduano
- Succeeded by: Noam Bramson

Personal details
- Born: March 27, 1955 (age 71) New Rochelle, New York
- Party: Democratic
- Education: Iona College (BA); New York University (MPA)
- Website: Official website

Timothy C. Idoni (born March 27, 1955) is an American politician who served as the Westchester County Clerk between 2006 and 2026. He also served as mayor of the city of New Rochelle, New York. He was first elected mayor of New Rochelle in 1991 and was reelected three times. He resigned from mayor in January 2006 after having been elected Westchester County Clerk.

During his years as mayor, New Rochelle's downtown underwent substantial redevelopment. A long period of economic decay ended, as tenements, vacant stores, and light industry were replaced with middle to upper-income apartment buildings, an entertainment complex, parkland, and large retailers. About 2,000 jobs were created, and the tax base was significantly expanded.

He was preceded in office by Leonard Paduano, a Republican, and succeeded by Noam Bramson, a Democrat.

A Democrat, Idoni ran against Linda Doherty, Clerk of Eastchester, for Westchester County Clerk in 2005. Since taking office, he has worked to update the information technology of the county's licensing and record-keeping operations.
