= Alamo EMS =

- Motto: "Medical Transportation to meet your every need"
- Established: 1966 - 2009
- Headquarters: Poughkeepsie, New York
- Jurisdiction: Dutchess, Putnam, Orange and Ulster Counties; Poughkeepsie, NY
- Employees: 170 (at time of closing)
- BLS or ALS: ALS
- Ambulances: 35
- Medical director: Francine Brooks, MD.
- Responses: 50,000/year (2008)
- Website: www.alamoems.com

Alamo Emergency Medical Services, Inc. (Alamo EMS) was an Advanced Life Support (ALS) and Basic Life Support (BLS) ambulance service owned by Health Quest, with transportation services in the Hudson Valley region of New York. Alamo operated ambulances staffed by emergency medical technicians (EMTs) and paramedics.

Alamo held Emergency Response 9-1-1 contracts and CON's in Dutchess, Putnam, Orange and Ulster Counties.

== History ==
Alamo Ambulance began in the early 1960s in Binghamton, New York by paramedic James Alamo. In 1966 Jim Alamo moved the company to Poughkeepsie, New York. On March 21, 1966, The Poughkeepsie Common Council voted to contract with Alamo and replace the ambulance contract they had with Vassar and St Francis Hospitals. The initial contact called for Alamo to bill $20 per private call, $16 for welfare calls and a $5 surcharge if oxygen was used. Alamo EMS was one of the main EMS companies to offer services to Dutchess County in the late 1900s. Before ambulances were readily available, Alamo would have "Fly Cars" or paramedics that have an SUV with all the equipment an ambulance has, including a drug box. This was more practical for towns and jurisdictions that didn't have enough residents to merit a separate ambulance. Often the paramedic would ride in the back of a town ambulance to provide advanced medical care to the patient en route to the hospital.

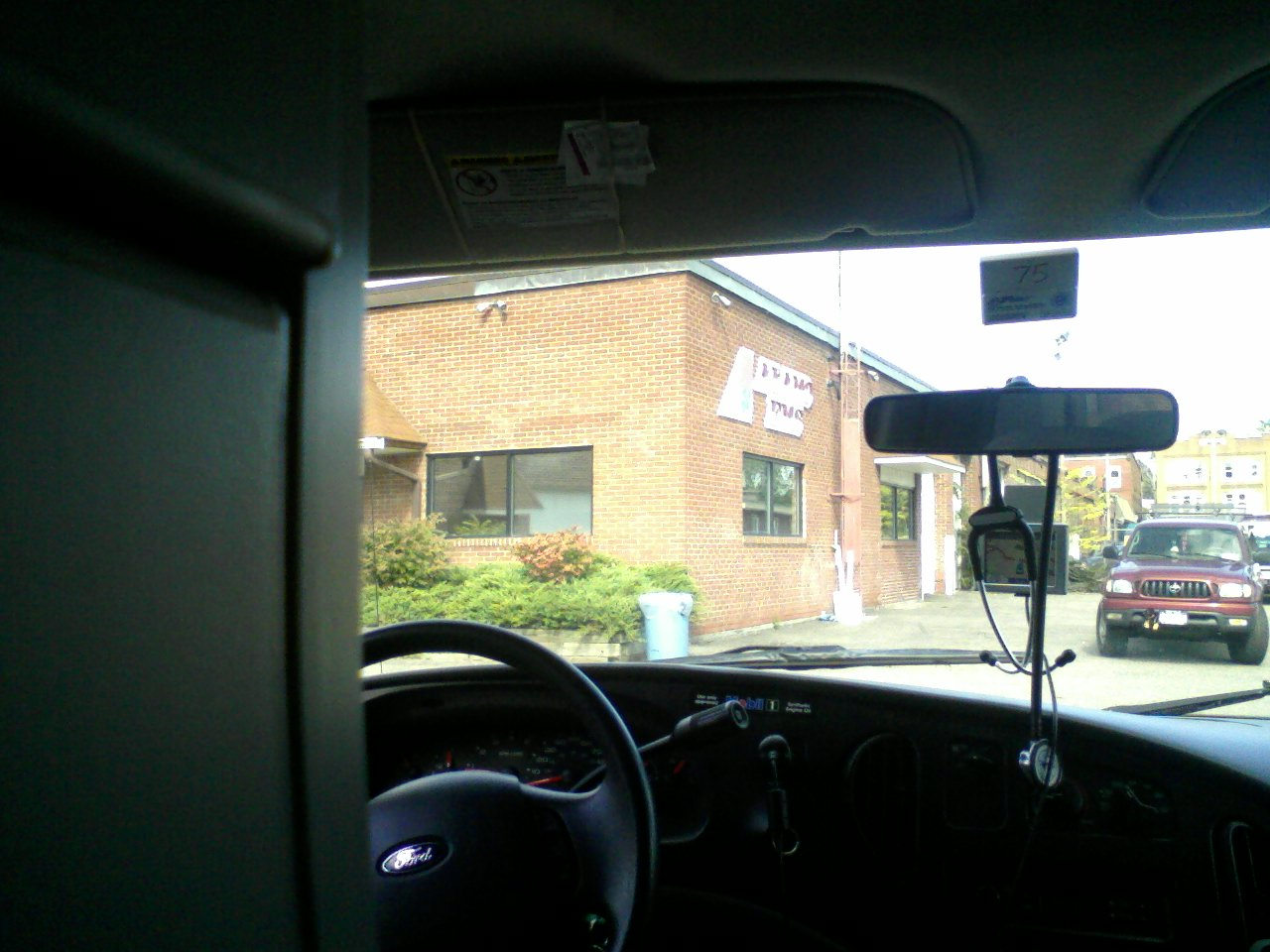
The headquarters of Alamo in the City of Poughkeepsie, seen from an ambulance.

In 1996 Alamo became the 51st ambulance service in the United States and the first not-for-profit in the Northeast to be accredited by the Commission on Accreditation of Ambulance Services (CAAS). CAAS [1] is a non-profit organization which was established to encourage and promote quality patient care in America's medical transportation system. The primary focus of the Commission's standards is high-quality patient care. This is accomplished by establishing national standards which not only address the delivery of patient care, but also the ambulance service's total operation and its relationships with other agencies, the general public, and the medical community. The Commission's standards often exceed state or local licensing requirements. In 2004 Alamo received its second perfect score for re-accreditation and still maintains its accreditation today.

On December 14, 2007, Northern Dutchess Paramedics announced a proposed merger with Alamo EMS. The application was the first step in the regulatory process toward creating an organization which was aimed at better serving the Hudson Valley community in providing emergency and ambulance services. The joint venture would also have required approval from the New York State Attorney General's Office, and the New York State Supreme Court. Health Quest and Northern Dutchess Paramedics anticipated that the regulatory process would take approximately six to twelve months; however as of December 31, 2008 the merger was not completed and is now abandoned. If it had been completed it would have created the largest independent ambulance provider in the Hudson Valley Region.

On December 17, 2008, the two companies announced that the merger had fallen through, and would not be completed. The companies claimed they had differences that could not be settled. In January 2009 Health Quest began allocating additional funding to Alamo to aid their goal of covering most of the towns in Dutchess County.

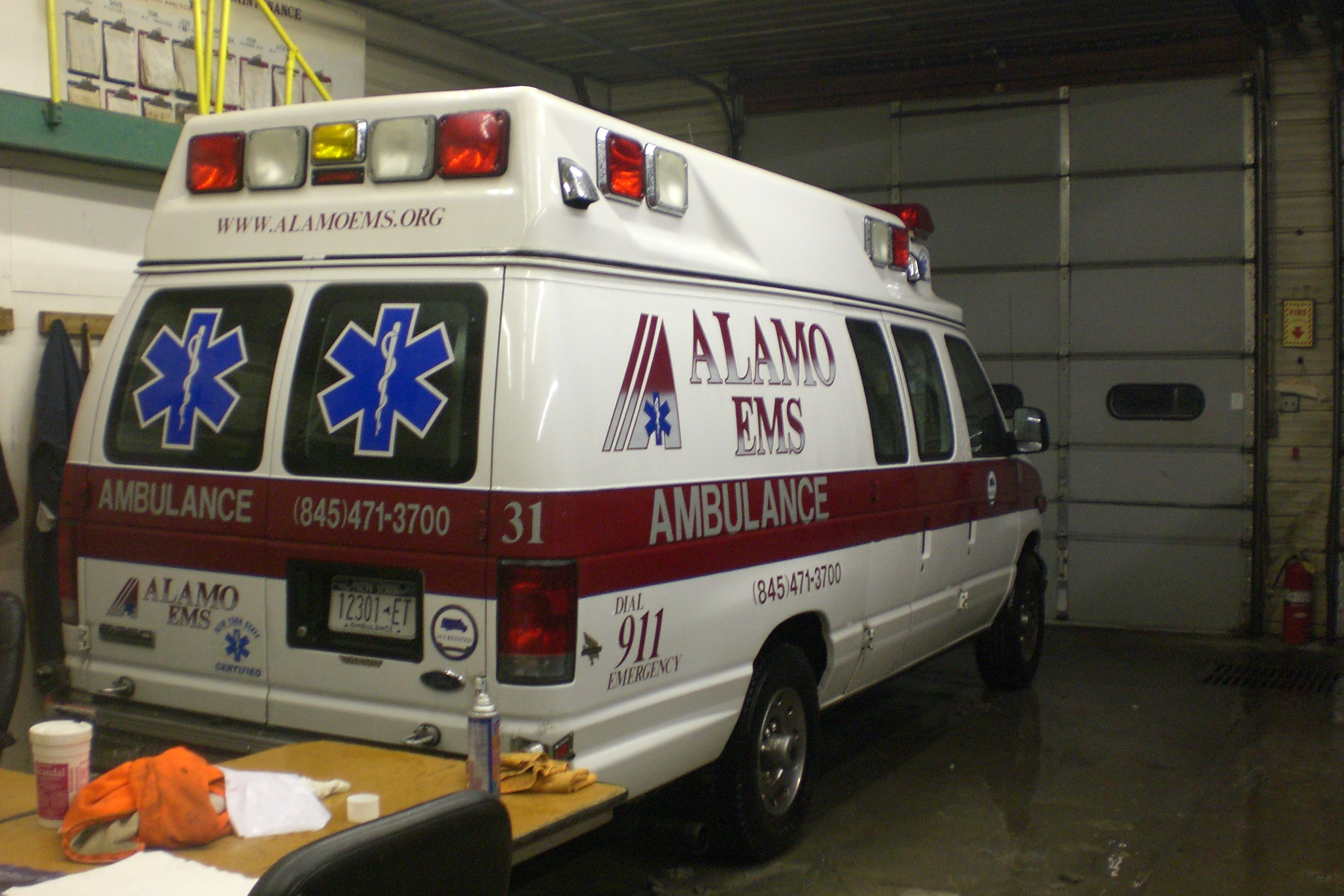
Alamo Medic 31 at its final day of operation in the Town Of Beekman.

On June 4, 2009, Health Quest, the parent company of Alamo EMS, announced to its employees that the company has been sold to TransCare, with a projected completion of acquisition of August 1, 2009. The date was pushed back to a later date due to the complexities involved in the takeover. On September 19, 2009, the buyout was completed and all Alamo EMS services were terminated and transitioned to TransCare.

Up until its demise in 2009, Alamo EMS was the only community-owned ambulance service and was governed by an all-volunteer board of trustees composed of community leaders, and under the guidance the umbrella organization Health Quest. As a "not-for-profit, charitable organization, all operating funds went back into Alamo and increased the quality of the ambulance service offered.

Other than emergency medical services, Alamo operated a full-time Ambulette service which provided service to the disabled seven days a week. Also a Training and Education division hosted a wide array of medical training available to all employees and residents of the jurisdictions of the towns they served.

Alamo Ambulance Service, Inc. remains a certified ambulance service listed by New York New York State Department of Health Bureau of EMS, with one registered ambulance. The address listed is the same as the Healthquest corporate office.

== Final Management ==
- General Manager, Marc Reina
- Operations Manager, Eric Flynn
- Communications Manager, Larry Bigando
- Communications Supervisor, Wendy Perruna
- Project Manager, George Thomas
