= George Vergara =

American football player and politician (1901–1982)

Profile
- Position: End

Personal information
- Born: March 18, 1901; New York, New York, U.S.
- Died: August 13, 1982 (aged 81); Montrose, New York, U.S.
- Listed height: 6 ft 1 in (1.85 m)
- Listed weight: 190 lb (86 kg)

Career information
- College: Notre Dame

Career history
- Green Bay Packers (1925)

Career statistics
- Games played: 12
- Stats at Pro Football Reference

George Aloysius Vergara (March 18, 1901 – August 13, 1982) was a player in the National Football League (NFL). He played with the Green Bay Packers during the 1925 NFL season. He later served as the mayor of New Rochelle, New York.

Political offices
Preceded by Stanley W. Church	15th Mayor of New Rochelle; 1956–1959	Succeeded by Stanely W. Church
