= Lawton blackberry =

Berry cultivar

- Genus: Rubus
- Breeder: Lewis Seacor
- Origin: New Rochelle, New York

The Lawton blackberry (often referred to as New Rochelle and Seacor's Mammoth) originated in the village of New Rochelle in New York, and was the first widely cultivated variety of blackberry in the United States. It was either an accidental seedling from a wild variety of blackberry, or possibly a sort accidentally brought to this country by the French Huguenots who settled New Rochelle in 1688. The fruit-bearing bush is from the genus Rubus, in the rose family, and bears large berries that grow to about an inch long.

The first plant was discovered in 1834 by Lewis Seacor, who noticed the plant growing wild in a field owned by neighbor Frederick Prime. Seacor was initially drawn to the fruit on account of its large size and rich flavor and, in 1838, he removed some of the plants to his garden and began their cultivation. Several years later he began distributing plants to neighbors and townspeople whose interest in the new fruit helped spread its notoriety. Throughout the region the blackberry became commonly known as"Seacor's Mammoth". In 1848, George Seymour & Co., of Norwalk, Ct., nurserymen, obtained some plants and began working to increase their stock before advertising the new berry to the general public. At the same time, William Lawton, also of New Rochelle, obtained his first plants and spent the next several years working on their propagation. In 1853, Lawton showed the berries at a meeting of the "American Farmers' Club", stating that while he did not know who initially discovered the plant and brought it into garden culture, it was found on the roadside and thence introduced into neighboring gardens. The Farmers' Club passed a vote of thanks to Mr. Lawton, and named the fruit the "Lawton Blackberry".

Individuals in New Rochelle, acquainted with the blackberry, knew of its discovery by Seacor and referred to the plant as "Seacor's" or "Seacor's Mammoth". It was also well known that Mr. Prince, owner of the farm where the fruit was found, actually destroyed many of the original bushes while making improvements to the property without knowing anything of their existence, and, was it not for Seacor's efforts, the fruit would have become extinct.
