= Trinity-St. Paul's Episcopal Church (New Rochelle, New York) =

Historic church in New York, United States

- U.S. National Register of Historic Places
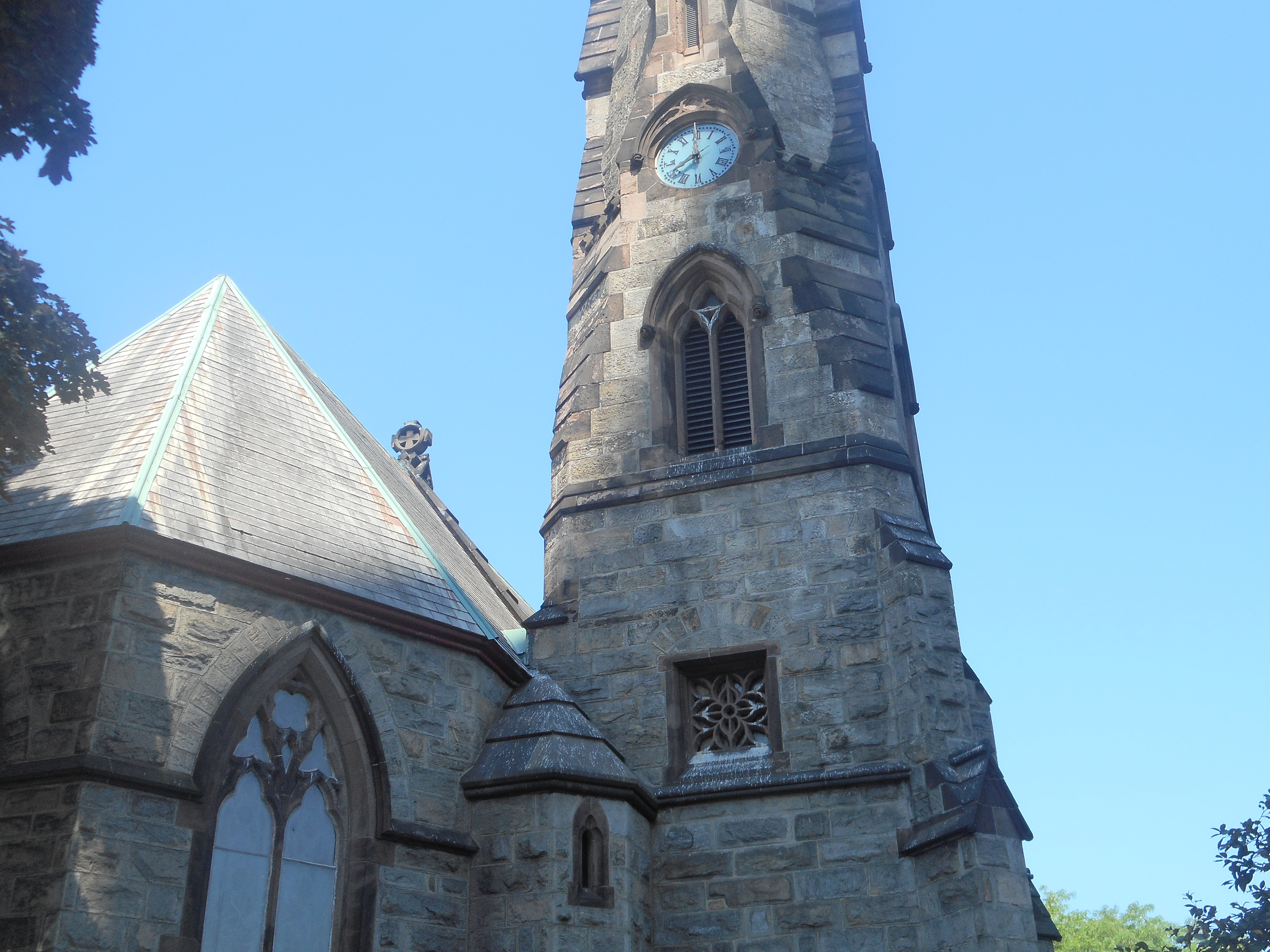
- The clock tower at Trinity-St. Paul's Episcopal Church

- Location within New York Location within the United States
- Location: 311 Huguenot St., New Rochelle, New York
- Coordinates: 40°54′34″N 73°47′04″W
- Area: 1.6 acres (0.65 ha)
- Built: 1862–1864
- Architect: Richard Upjohn & Son; F. Carlos Merry
- Architectural style: Gothic Revival
- NRHP reference No.: 06000576
- Added to NRHP: July 12, 2006

Trinity-St. Paul's Episcopal Church in New Rochelle in Westchester County, New York was added to the National Register of Historic Places in 2006. It is located at the northwest corner of Huguenot Street (also known as the Boston Post Road) and Division Street. This church represents the body of the majority group of New Rochelle's founding Huguenot French Calvinistic congregation that conformed to the liturgy of the established Church of England in June 1709. King George III gave Trinity its first charter in 1762. After the American Revolutionary War, Trinity became a parish of the Protestant Episcopal Church of America.

The present building is the third church erected by the conformist congregation. It is the immediate successor of a wooden church building erected in 1823–1824. It stands on land that was conveyed to the church wardens by Aman Guion in 1743. The cornerstone was laid on August 13, 1862, the church was opened for worship September 13, 1863, and the tower completed November 30, 1864. The church was designed by Richard Upjohn & Son, known for their Gothic Revival architecture.

A parish house was added on the western side of the church in 1892. Constructed of the same granite and brownstone materials as the church, the structure was designed by architect Frederick Carles Merry, who also designed the New Rochelle Trust building on Main Street.

== Church heirlooms ==
Within the stone walls of the church are a number of artifacts, or 'heirlooms', that have been handed down through generations of this 300-year-old congregation. They highlight the long history of the church and of the New Rochelle community. A silver chalice presented to the church by Queen Anne of England, received after its conformation to the Church of England in 1709, is inscribed "Anne Regina".

The stained glass windows in the chancel are memorials to the Rev. Bondet, the Rev. Pierre Stouppe and the Rev. Michael Houdin, Trinity's first three ministers. Many other stained glass windows, some of which were crafted by Tiffany, grace the church. The 19th and 20th century congregants, for whom the windows were dedicated, include such names as Iselin, Weyman, Davenport, Thorne and Lathers.

The old bell originally in the French Huguenot Church, Eglise du St. Esprit, on Pine Street in New York City, is preserved as a relic in the tower room. In 1823, it was presented to Trinity Church, New Rochelle, and hung up in the tower of the wooden church erected in 1823 - 1824.

== Huguenot Burying Ground ==
The grounds of the church and the Parish House has a rich history that spans three centuries. On Trinity's land, three former town cemeteries now exist as one. Beginning with the first burial, that of James Bertine's daughter in 1802, a cemetery was established just west of the present Parish House and became known as the "Trinity Graveyard". Just north of the church site was the private burial ground of the Allaire family, founding members of the community. A monument to "Alexander the Huguenot" marked the plot and the grave of its first burial. Captain Allaire died in 1782, and his descendants continued to be buried in the family plot until the 1940s. The third and oldest cemetery, the Huguenot Burying Ground, was located just beyond the Allaire's at the southwest side of Division Street at the corner of Union Avenue. The plot was part of the farm of Louis Bongrand, one of the first Huguenot settlers of the Town. In 1693 he gave the plot to the future residents of New Rochelle for a churchyard to bury their dead. The land southeast of the plot was eventually acquired by Trinity Church and all boundaries between the three cemeteries were erased. The arrival of the New York-New Haven railway line in 1849 had carved its way through the village, physically splitting the two once more. A large tract church land had been acquired by Westchester County which ran along the north side of the right of way of the railroad for the route of the projected Pelham-Port Chester Parkway. Although the parkway had not yet been built, the purchase required to removal of the bodies and tombstones from it to the church land on the south side of the railroad. The old burial ground had become otherwise nearly obliterated due to a long period of neglect, the destruction of headstones, and the laying out of new plots over older, unmarked ones. By the time of construction of the New England Thruway in 1956, just one of the final resting places was left to remain, with the Huguenot Burying Ground and the Allaire family cemetery being eliminated for the new six-lane highway.

After much litigation and negotiation, the graves of the two cemeteries were removed, an endeavor paid for by the New England Thruway, and coordinated by the Rev. Philip M. Styles of Trinity Church. The early New Rochelleans and their descendants were dug up, placed in special boxes and reburied on the church's land. Although 178 graves were opened, it is estimated that more than 400 Huguenots and Siwanoy Indian "friends" had been buried in the first cemetery. A monument in the Trinity yard marks the re-interred graves of the unknowns, and the extant stones moved along with the remains are placed nearby. The church's "Huguenot Memorial Cemetery", or "Huguenot Burying Ground", has since been recognized as an historic cemetery that is the resting place for a wide cross section of the Huguenot founders, early settlers and other prominent citizens.

== Gallery ==
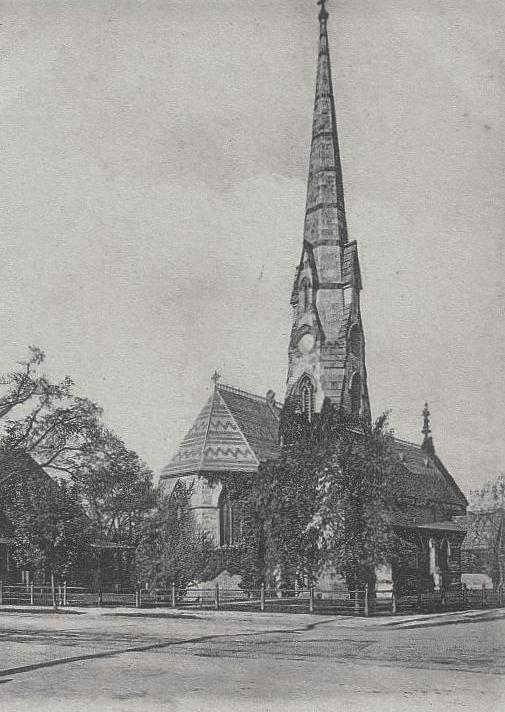

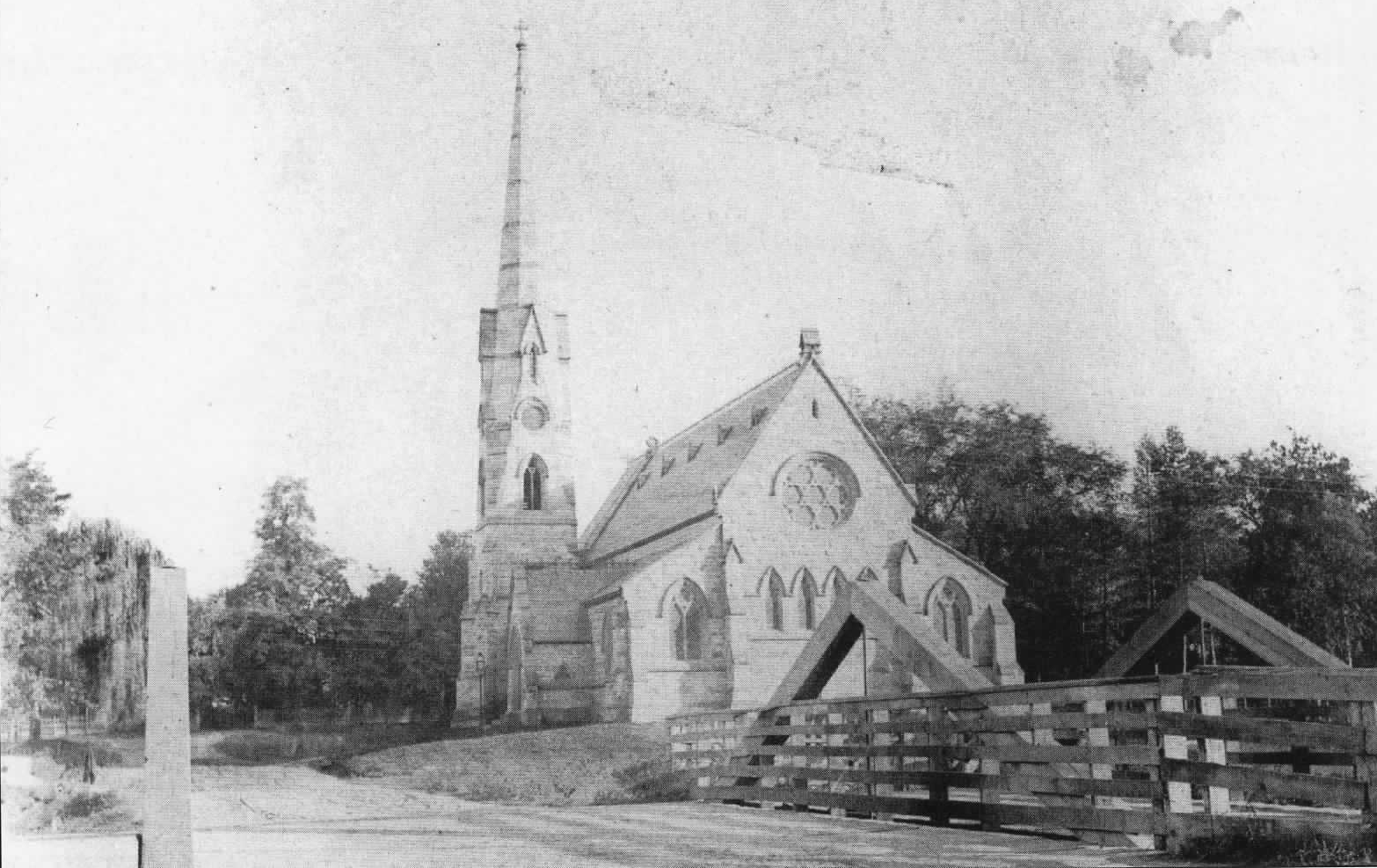
