= New Rochelle, New York =

City in New York, United States

- City
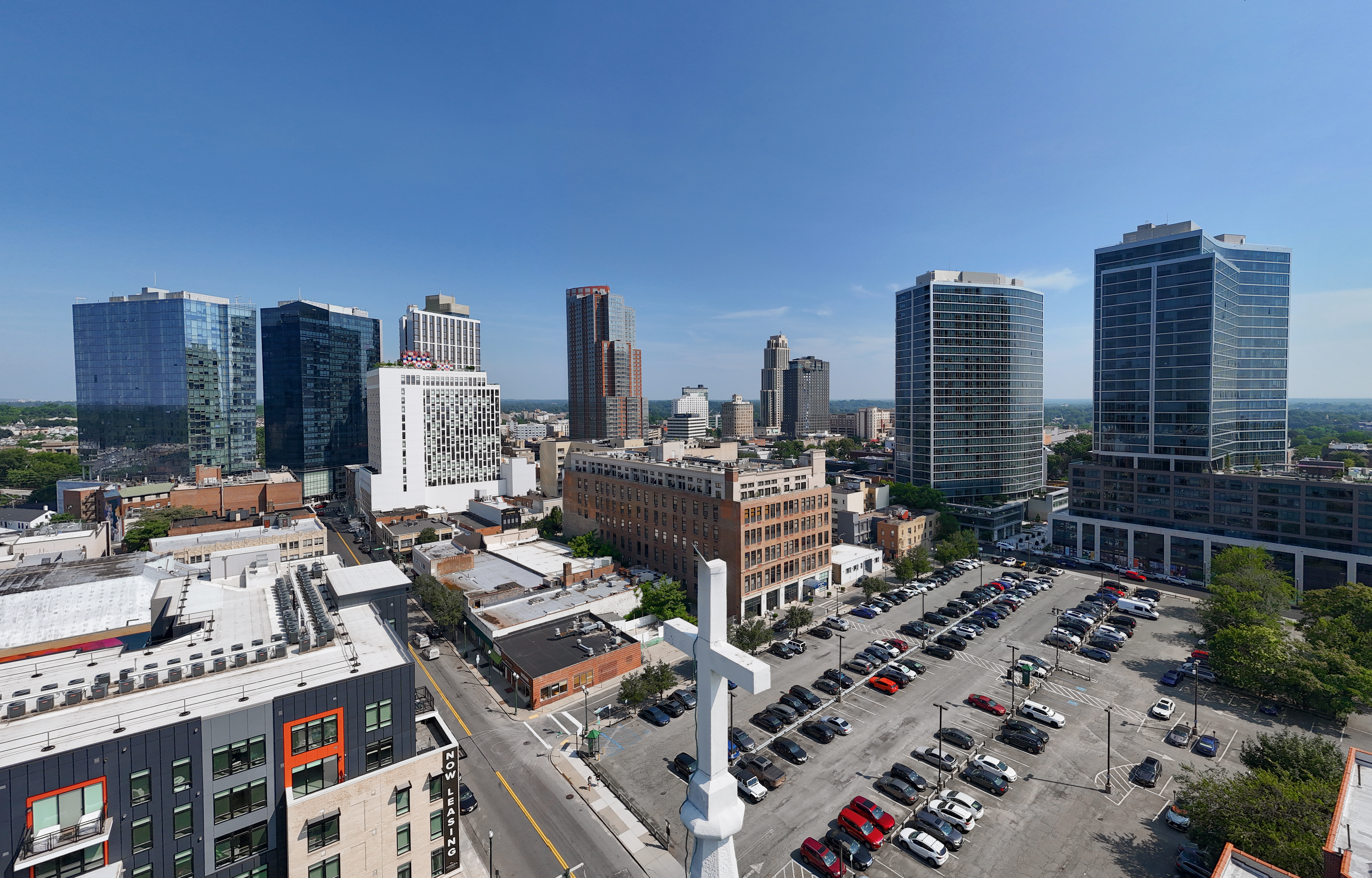
- New Rochelle's skyline in 2025

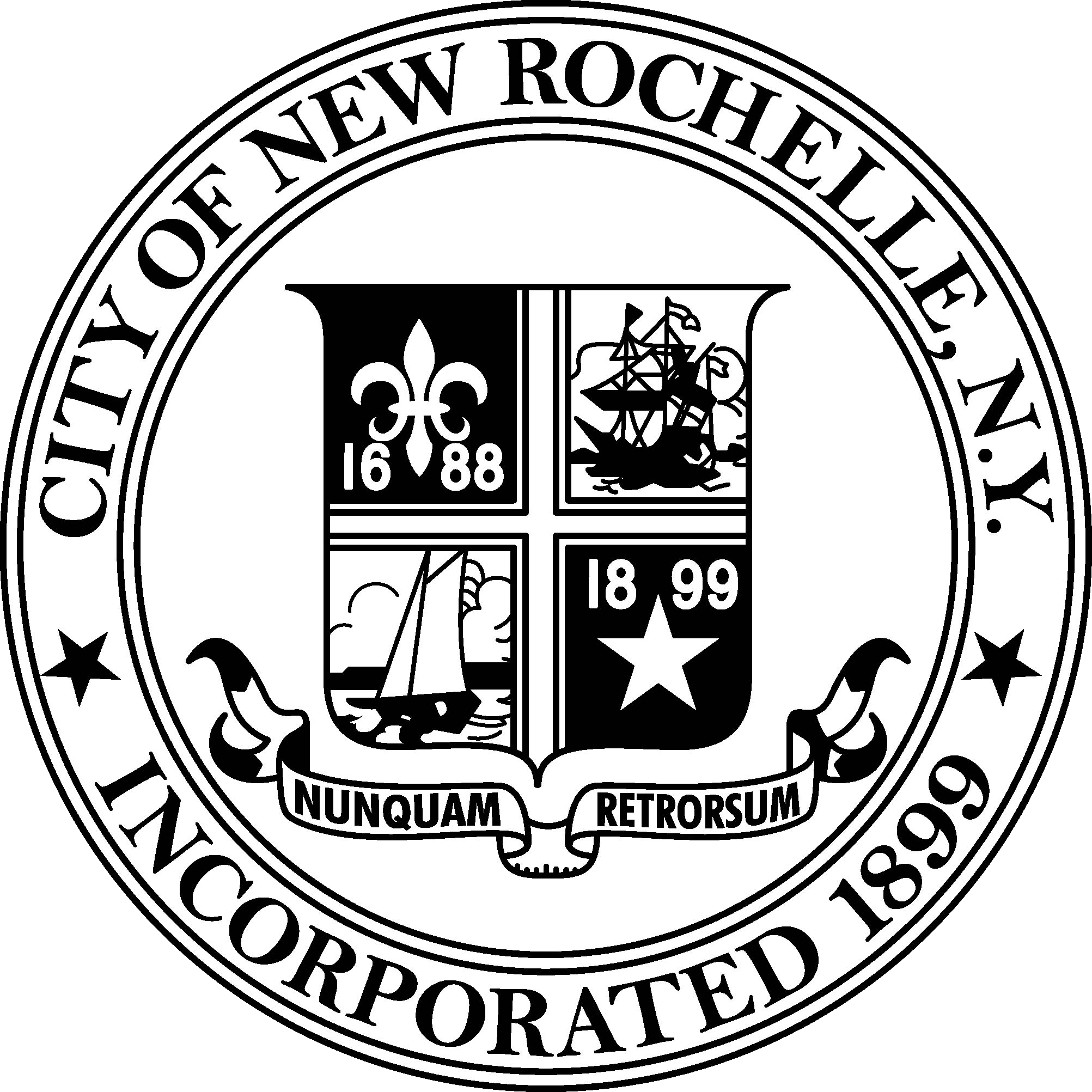
- Flag Seal Logo
- Nickname: Queen City of the Sound
- Motto: Nunquam Retrorsum (Never Backward)
- Location within Westchester County and the state of New York
- Interactive map of New Rochelle
- Coordinates: 40°54′31″N 73°46′55″W
- Country: United States
- State: New York
- County: Westchester
- Incorporated (city): 1899
- Named for: La Rochelle, France

Government
  - Type: Council-Manager
  - Mayor: Yadira Ramos-Herbert (D)
  - City Manager: Wilfredo Melendez, P.E.
  - City Council: Members' List: District 1: • Martha Lopez-Hanratty (D); District 2: • Albert Tarantino (R); District 3: • David Peters (D); District 4: • Shane Osinloye (D); District 5: • Sara Kaye (D); District 6: • Matt Stern (D)

Area
  - Total: 13.15 sq mi (34.05 km^{2})
  - Land: 10.29 sq mi (26.64 km^{2})
  - Water: 2.86 sq mi (7.40 km^{2})
- Elevation: 85 ft (26 m)

Population (2020)
  - Total: 79,726
  - Density: 7,750.9/sq mi (2,992.62/km^{2})
- Time zone: UTC−5 (Eastern (EST))
  - Summer (DST): UTC−4 (EDT)
- ZIP Codes: 10801–10802, 10804–10805
- Area code: 914
- FIPS code: 36-50617
- GNIS feature ID: 958451
- Website: newrochelleny.gov

New Rochelle (/rəˈʃɛl/ rə-SHEL) is a city in Westchester County, New York, United States. It is a suburb outside of New York City, located about 17 miles (27 km) from Midtown Manhattan. The city had a population of 79,726 at the time of the 2020 census, making it the seventh-largest city and 22nd-most-populous municipality in New York.

== History ==
=== 17th and 18th centuries ===
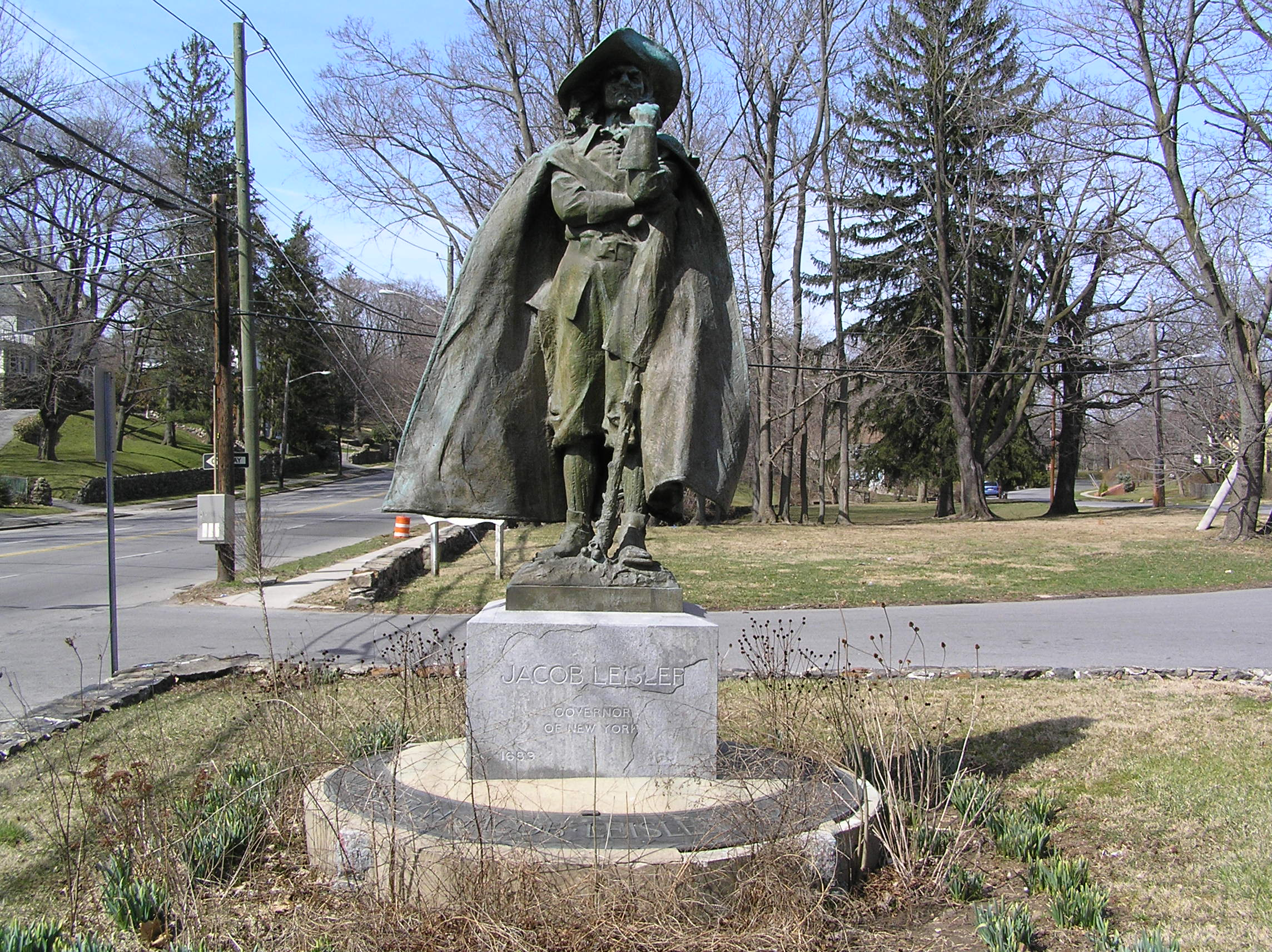
Statue of Jacob Leisler

This area was occupied by cultures of indigenous peoples for thousands of years. They made use of the rich resources of Long Island Sound and inland areas.

By the 17th century, the historic Lenape bands, who spoke a language in the Algonquian family, were prominent in the area. Their territory extended from the coastal areas of western present-day Connecticut, Long Island, and south through New Jersey, Maryland, and Delaware.

In 1654, the Siwanoy Indians, a band of Lenape (also known as the Delaware by English colonists), sold land to English settler Thomas Pell. Some 33 families established the community of La Nouvelle-Rochelle (French pronunciation: [la nuvɛl ʁɔʃɛl]) in 1688. Many of them were artisans and craftsmen from La Rochelle, France, after which they named the settlement. The people continued to speak French, and a common practice for people in neighboring areas was to send their children to New Rochelle to learn the language. A monument containing the names of these settlers stands in Hudson Park, the original landing point of the Huguenots. In 1689, Pell officially deeded 6,100 acres (25 km^{2}) for the establishment of a Huguenot community.

Jacob Leisler is an important figure in the early histories of both New Rochelle and the United States. He arrived in America as a mercenary in the British Army and later became one of the most prominent merchants in New York. He was subsequently appointed acting governor of the province; during his tenure he acted on behalf of the Huguenots.

One condition of the sale was that Pell and his heirs would receive "one fatt calfe" on June 24 of every year thereafter, if demanded. The "fatt calfe" was commemorated in the New Rochelle 250th Anniversary half dollar, minted in 1937. Pell's descendants did not request a calf until the 1950s. Since then, there have been occasional "fatt calfe" ceremonies.

Of all the Huguenot settlements in America founded with the intention of being distinctly French colonies, New Rochelle most clearly fulfilled such plans. The colony attracted French refugees until as late as 1760, during the French and Indian War in North America between Britain and France.

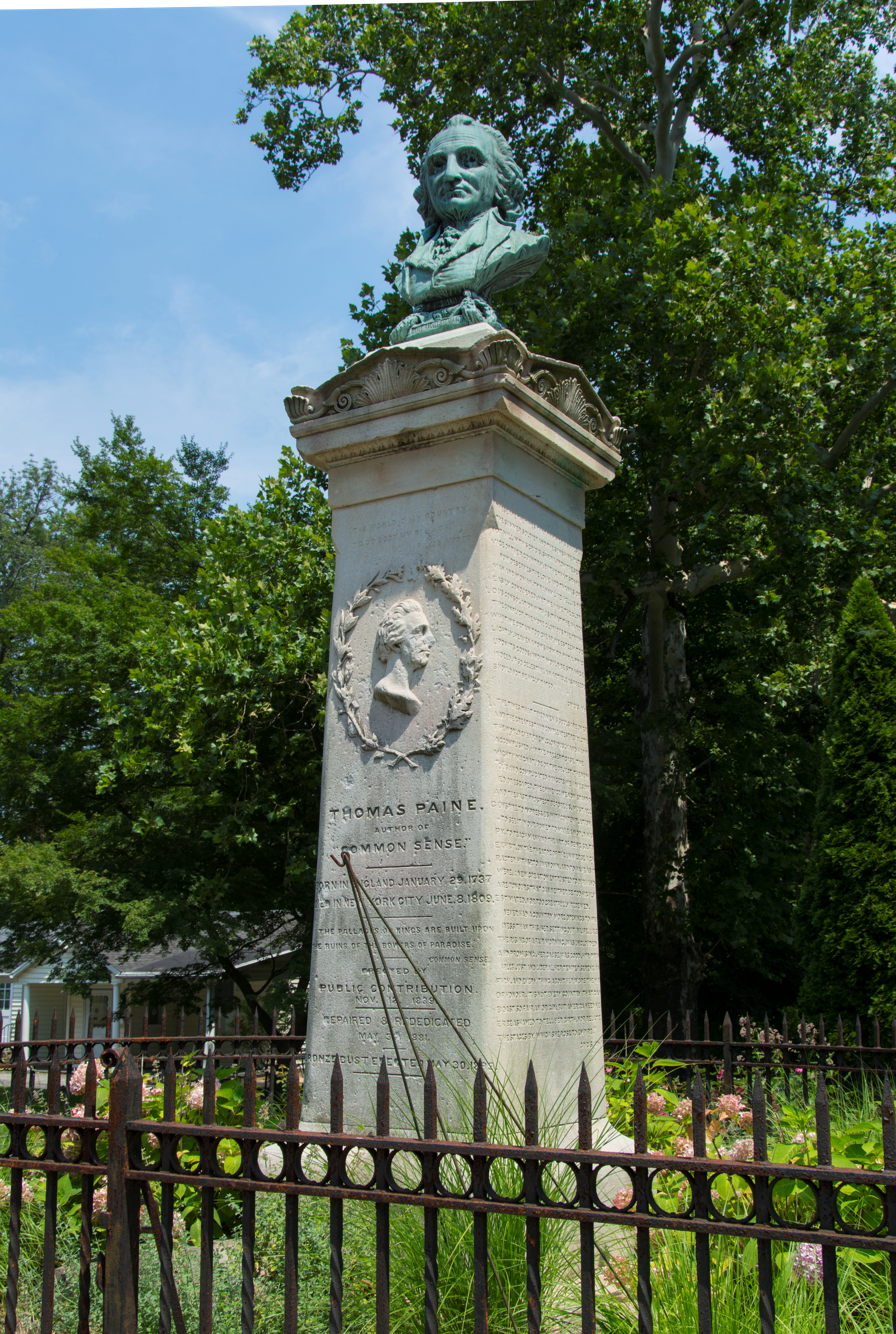
Thomas Paine Monument

In 1775, General George Washington stopped in New Rochelle on his way to assume command of the Army of the United Colonies in Massachusetts. In 1776 the British Army briefly occupied sections of New Rochelle and Larchmont. Following British victory in the Battle of White Plains, New Rochelle became part of the infamous Neutral Ground of Westchester County.

After the Revolutionary War ended, in 1784, patriot Thomas Paine was given a farm in New Rochelle for his service to the cause of independence. The farm, totaling about 300 acres (1.2 km^{2}), had been confiscated from its owners by the state of New York due to their Tory activities.

The first national census of 1790 shows New Rochelle with 692 residents. Some 136 were African American, including 36 who were freemen; the remainder were enslaved.

=== 19th and 20th centuries ===
Through the 18th century, New Rochelle had remained a modest village that retained an abundance of agricultural land. During the 19th century, however, New York City was a destination from the mid-century on by waves of immigration, principally from Ireland and Germany. More established American families left New York City and moved into this area. Although the original Huguenot population was rapidly shrinking in relative size, through ownership of land, businesses, banks, and small manufactures, they retained a predominant hold on the political and social life of the town.

The 1820 Census showed 150 African Americans residing in New Rochelle, six of whom were still enslaved. The state abolished slavery by degrees; children of enslaved mothers were born free, and all enslaved people were freed by 1827.

In 1857, the Village of New Rochelle was established within the borders of the Town of New Rochelle. A group of volunteers created the first fire service in 1861. In 1899, a bill creating the New Rochelle City Charter was signed by Governor Theodore Roosevelt. Through this bill, the Village and Town of New Rochelle were joined into one municipality. In 1899, Michael J. Dillon narrowly defeated Hugh A. Harmer to become New Rochelle's first mayor. The recently established city charter designated a board of aldermen as the legislative unit with two members to be elected from each of four wards and 10 elected from the city at-large.

By 1900, New Rochelle had a population of 14,720. Throughout the city, farms, estates, and wooded homesteads were bought up by realty and development companies. Planned residential neighborhoods such as Rochelle Park, one of the first planned communities in the country, soon spread across the city, earning New Rochelle the sobriquet "City of Homes". In 1909, Edwin Thanhouser established Thanhouser Film Corporation. Thanhouser's The Million Dollar Mystery was one of the first serial motion pictures. In 1923, New Rochelle resident Anna Jones became the first African-American woman to be admitted to the New York State Bar.

Poet and resident James J. Montague captured the image of New Rochelle at the time in his 1926 poem "Queen City of the Sound".

In 1930, New Rochelle recorded a population of 54,000, up from 36,213 only 10 years earlier. During the 1930s, New Rochelle was the wealthiest city per capita in New York and the third-wealthiest in the country.

By the end of the century, the Metro North railroad station was rebuilt along with a $190 million entertainment complex, nicknamed New Roc City, which featured a 19-screen movie theater, an IMAX theater, an indoor ice hockey arena, mini-golf, go karts, an arcade, restaurants, a hotel, loft apartments, and a megasupermarket. The complex was built on the site of the former New Rochelle Mall, which had opened in 1968.

=== 21st century ===
In 2014, New Rochelle's planning board approved $149 million in developments to three major sections of the city. The developments include restaurants, stores, hotels, an entertainment area, theaters, and a mixed-use waterfront area, and were expected to be completed within 10 years. Additional tax breaks ranging in the tens of millions of dollars have since been awarded by the city government to further the redevelopment of the downtown area.

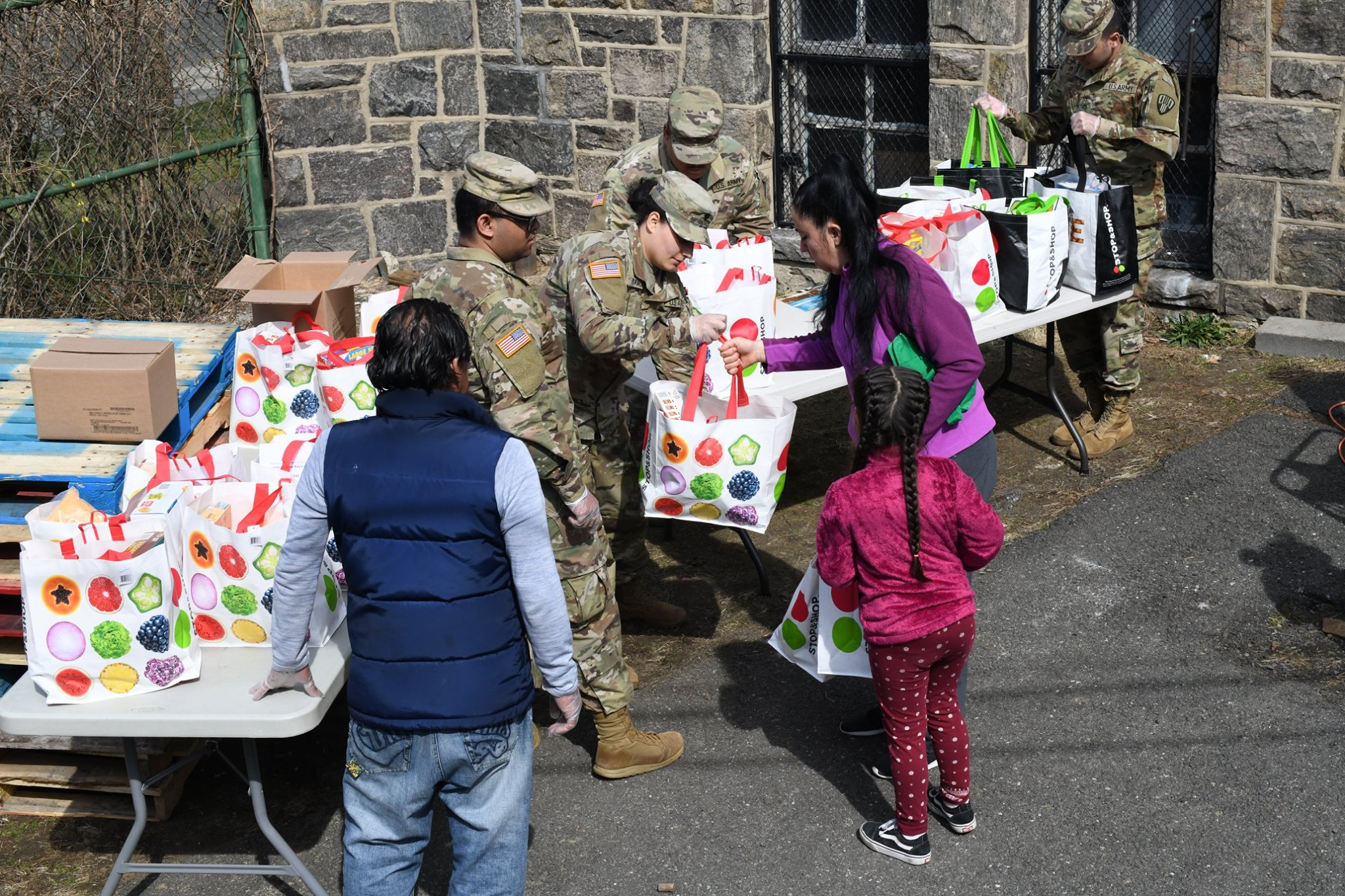
Members of the New York National Guard distribute groceries in New Rochelle on March 18, 2020

In March 2020, New Rochelle became one of the first reported centers for COVID-19 transmission in New York during the 2019–20 coronavirus outbreak. On March 10, 2020, Governor Andrew Cuomo ordered components of the New York Air National Guard and New York Army National Guard to institute a one-mile radius containment area centered around the Young Israel of New Rochelle synagogue in the Wykagyl section of the city in an attempt to stem the spread of the virus. The implementation of this containment area, which covered multiple neighborhoods in New Rochelle and extended into parts of the neighboring Town of Eastchester, marked the first use in the state of New York of social distancing measures and the closure of schools, houses of worship, and other institutions to combat the spread of the pandemic. Large gathering places including schools and places of worship were declared closed, while National Guard troops were deployed to provide logistical support such as assistance with the distribution of food and the disinfection of public areas.

=== Historic sites ===
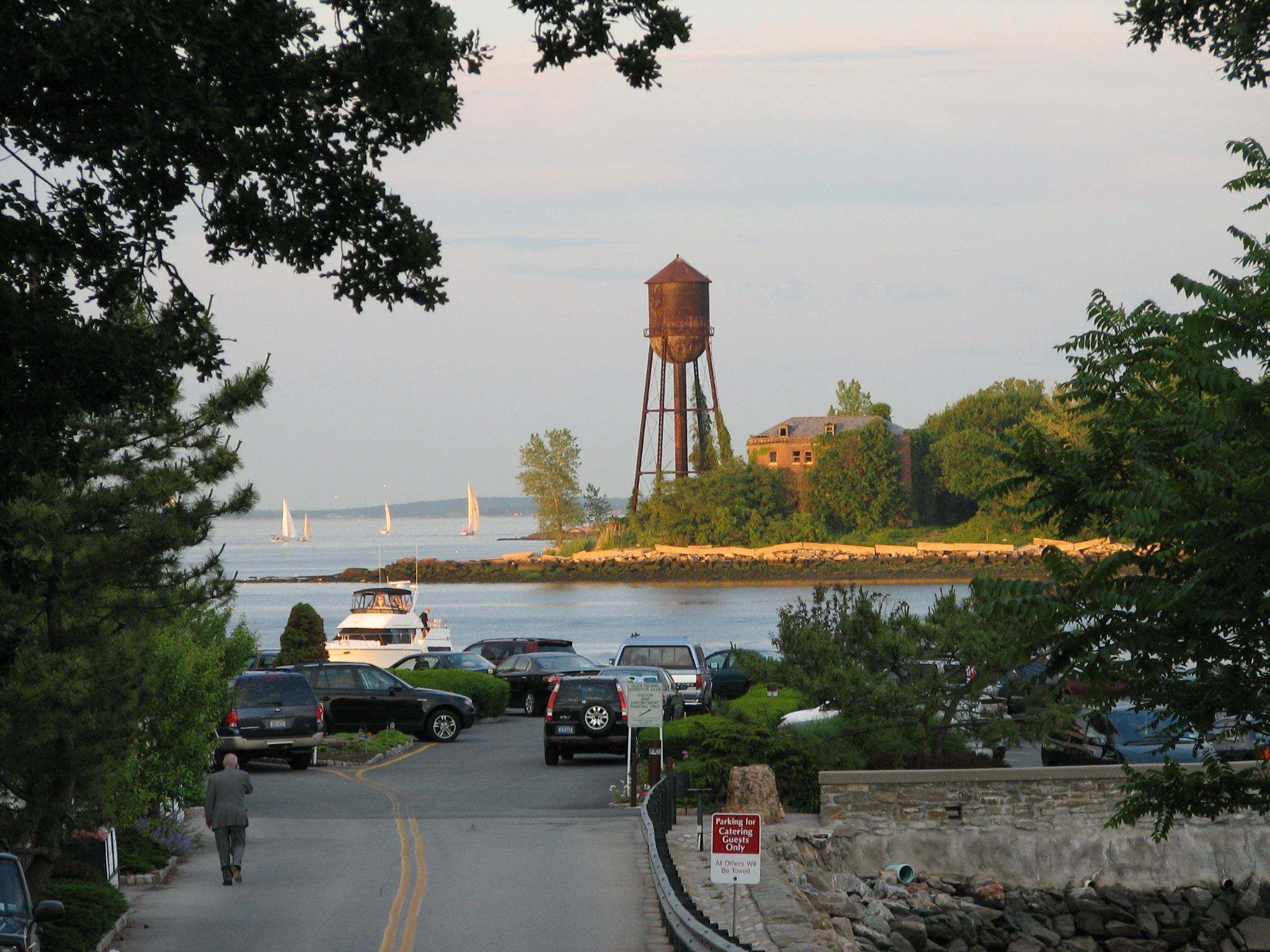
Overlooking Davids Island

- Columbia Island is a small island (about 150 feet (46 m) square) situated between Davids Island and Pea Island. Until 1940, it was known as Little Pea Island. CBS purchased it and built a concrete foundation to support a transmitter building topped by a 410-foot (120 m) tall antenna tower for WCBS-AM. The transmitter remained in operation until the 1960s, when the station was moved to nearby High Island.
- Execution Rocks Lighthouse is centered in the middle of Long Island Sound, just south of Davids Island. The structure was built in 1849 and includes a 55-foot (17 m) tall tower and the 'keeper's house'. It is rumored that the lighthouse's site got its name before the American Revolutionary War when British colonial authorities executed people by chaining them to the rocks at low tide and allowing the rising water to drown them. In reality, the name was chosen to reflect the historically dangerous shipping area created by the exposure of the rocks during low tides.
- Huckleberry Island – a 10-acre (40,000 m^{2}) island owned by the Huckleberry Indians, Inc., a club within the New York Athletic Club. The island is an important nesting site for waterbirds such as egrets and night herons.
- Leland Castle is a 19th-century Gothic Revival castle built as the summer residence of Simeon Leland, a wealthy New York City hotel entrepreneur. It has since been acquired by the College of New Rochelle and is used as an art gallery available to the public.
- St. John's Wilmot Church is a historic Episcopal parish located in the northern end of the city at the intersection of North Avenue and Wilmot Road, formerly referred to as "Cooper's Corner".
- Thomas Paine Historical Site is a historical nexus within the city; the site comprises the country home of the American pamphleteer and Revolutionary War hero Thomas Paine, his burial site, monument, and a museum. Paine's Cottage was built in 1793 and is a National Historic Landmark. The Thomas Paine Memorial Building, built in 1925, houses the library and museum collection of the Thomas Paine National Historical Association. Also on the site is the Brewster Schoolhouse, one of the oldest structural relics in Westchester County.
- Trinity-St. Paul's Episcopal Church was added to the National Register of Historic Places in 2006. It is located at the northwest corner of Huguenot Street (also known as the Boston Post Road) and Division Street. This church represents the body of the majority group of New Rochelle's founding Huguenot French Calvinistic congregation that conformed to the liturgy of the established Church of England in June 1709. King George III gave Trinity its first charter in 1762. After the Revolutionary War, Trinity became a parish of the Protestant Episcopal Church of America.
- Lincoln Park was added to the African American Heritage Trail of Westchester County in 2026. A vibrant, predominantly African American community, historically known as the "Harlem of Westchester," thrived there from the 1900s Great Migration through the 1960s, when it was disrupted by urban renewal and highway construction.

== Geography ==
New Rochelle is located at the southeastern point of continental New York. It lies on the Long Island Sound, bordered on the west by Pelham, Pelham Manor, and Eastchester, by Scarsdale to the north and east, and Mamaroneck and Larchmont to the east. The city lies 2 miles (3.2 km) north of the New York City border (Pelham Bay Park in the Bronx). According to the United States Census Bureau, the city has a total area of 13.2 square miles (34.3 km^{2}). The city has a roughly triangular shape, around 10 miles (16 km) from north to south and 1.5 miles (2 km) from east to west at its widest point.

== Demographics ==
Historical population
Census	Pop.	Note	%±
1790	692		—
1820	1,135		—
1830	1,274		12.2%
1840	1,816		42.5%
1850	2,458		35.4%
1860	3,519		43.2%
1870	3,915		11.3%
1880	5,276		34.8%
1890	9,057		71.7%
1900	14,720		62.5%
1910	28,867		96.1%
1920	36,213		25.4%
1930	54,000		49.1%
1940	58,408		8.2%
1950	59,725		2.3%
1960	76,812		28.6%
1970	75,385		−1.9%
1980	70,794		−6.1%
1990	67,265		−5.0%
2000	72,182		7.3%
2010	77,062		6.8%
2020	79,726		3.5%
2024 (est.)	85,512		7.3%
U.S. Decennial Census

=== 2020 census ===
As of the 2020 census, New Rochelle had a population of 79,726. The median age was 40.1 years. 20.7% of residents were under the age of 18 and 17.8% of residents were 65 years of age or older. For every 100 females there were 93.1 males, and for every 100 females age 18 and over there were 89.7 males age 18 and over.

100.0% of residents lived in urban areas, while 0.0% lived in rural areas.

There were 28,702 households in New Rochelle, of which 32.2% had children under the age of 18 living in them. Of all households, 46.5% were married-couple households, 17.4% were households with a male householder and no spouse or partner present, and 31.1% were households with a female householder and no spouse or partner present. About 28.9% of all households were made up of individuals and 13.4% had someone living alone who was 65 years of age or older.

There were 30,531 housing units, of which 6.0% were vacant. The homeowner vacancy rate was 1.6% and the rental vacancy rate was 5.3%.

Racial composition as of the 2020 census
Race	Number	Percent
White	35,429	44.4%
Black or African American	15,097	18.9%
American Indian and Alaska Native	926	1.2%
Asian	3,927	4.9%
Native Hawaiian and Other Pacific Islander	50	0.1%
Some other race	15,082	18.9%
Two or more races	9,215	11.6%
Hispanic or Latino (of any race)	26,257	32.9%

=== 2000 census ===
As measured by the 2000 census, New Rochelle had a population of 72,182 people, 24,275 occupied households, and 17,546 families. The population density was 6,973.5 inhabitants per square mile (2,692.5/km^{2}). The 26,995 housing units had an average density of 2,608.0 per square mile (1,007.0/km^{2}). The racial makeup of the city was 68% White, 19% African American, 0.20% Native American, 4% Asian, 0.05% Pacific Islander, 6% from other races, and 3% from two or more races. About 20% of the population were Hispanics or Latinos of any race. In the city, the age distribution was 24.0% under 18, 8.7% from 18 to 24, 29.5% from 25 to 44, 22.2% from 45 to 64, and 15.5% who were 65 or older. The median age was 37 years. For every 100 females, there were 90.7 males. For every 100 females 18 and over, there were 85.9 males. Of the 26,189 households, 32.7% had children under 18 living with them, 50.5% were married couples living together, 12.5% had a female householder with no husband present, and 33.0% were not families. About 28.0% of all households were made up of individuals, and 11.8% had someone living alone who was 65 or older. The average household size was 2.68, and the average family size was 3.29.

In 2000, 19,312 residents of New Rochelle were enrolled in school, with 2,743 in preschool or kindergarten, 8,105 in elementary school, 3,704 in high school, and 5,030 in college or graduate school. Of 42,872 individuals over 25, 20% (9,766) had no high school diploma, 23% (11,325) were high-school graduates, 14% (6,710) achieved some level of college education, 5% (2,347) held an associate's degree, 19% (9,120) held a bachelor's degree, and 20% (9,604) possessed a graduate or other advanced degree.

The working population was 35,262, 95.7% of whom were employed. The occupational breakdown had 42% working in management, 25% working in sales, 17% in services, 8% in construction, and 7% in production and transport. The average daily commute was 30 minutes, with 60% driving to work, 12% carpooling, 18% traveling by public transportation, and 7% using other means.

=== American Community Survey ===
According to the 2007 Census Bureau estimates, the median income for a household in the city was $64,756 and for a family was $88,004. About 9.8% of the population lived below the poverty line.

According to the American Community Survey in 2018, 5.2% of the population was West Indian.

=== Crime ===
According to the New Rochelle Police Department, New Rochelle is the safest city of its size in New York and the fifth-safest city of its size in the United States. Most of the crimes committed within New Rochelle are nonviolent property crimes, including burglary, larceny-theft, motor vehicle theft, and arson. Property crime, on a scale of 1 (low crime) to 10, is 4 compared to the US average of 3. Violent crime (murder and nonnegligent manslaughter, forcible rape, robbery, and aggravated assault) is 3, equal to the US average.

=== Residential profile ===
While the formerly industrial downtown section is more densely developed, with condominiums, high rises, offices, shopping centers, affordable housing complexes, a medical center, nursing homes, two college campuses, and an intermodal transportation hub, the rest of the city consists of sprawling residential neighborhoods. More than 11,500 single-family houses are within the city, more than those of neighboring Larchmont, Mamaroneck, and Scarsdale combined. The total number of separate households surpasses 26,000, more than those of neighboring Pelham, Pelham Manor, Eastchester, Scarsdale, Mamaroneck, and Larchmont combined.

==== Housing variety ====
The city contains a very diverse range of housing stock, composed of single-family and multifamily residences built from the 18th to the 21st centuries, which are characteristic of various historic and modern North American architectural styles. Historic housing types particularly common in the city's older residential neighborhoods are of the Queen Anne, Tudor Revival, and Colonial Revival styles that were in vogue as the city experienced its first period of great growth during the Gilded Age era. Brownstones, townhomes, red-brick apartment buildings, and modern mid-rise residential blocks are defining elements of the urban southwestern quarter of the city. With a population approaching 80,000 residents, New York state law dictates that the city must provide an adequate amount of affordable housing units. The city has been working to replace the existing Weyman Avenue Projects with more community-centered, townhouse-style housing units.

==== Communities ====
Within the greater city borders are many established neighborhoods and subsections, several of which are larger in both size and population than neighboring villages of Larchmont, Bronxville and Pelham Manor. The public community areas most noted include: Bayberry, Beechmont, Bloomingdale Estates, Bonnie Crest, Daisy Farms, Davenport Neck, Echo Manor, Forest Heights, Forest Knolls, French Ridge, Glen Island, Glenwood Lake, Lake Isle, Larchmont Woods, Northfield, Paine Heights, Pinebrook, Premium Point Park, Quaker Ridge, Residence Park, Rochelle Heights, San Souci, Scarsdale Downs, Shore Road, Sutton Manor, Vaneck Estates, Ward Acres, Wilmot Woods and Wykagyl. Brookridge, Riviera Shores, Premium Point, Pinebrook Hollow, Kensington Woods, and Cherry Lawn are gated neighborhoods accessible only by those immediate residents.

== Economy ==
New Rochelle has been home to a variety of industries over the years, including Thanhouser Film Studios, Terrytoons Studios, P.J. Tierney Diner Manufacturing, Flynn Burner Company, New York Seven Up (Joyce Beverages, Inc), RawlPlug, Inc., the Longines Symphonette Society, and Conran's USA. Manufacturing and warehousing have declined since the 1990s, as industrial land near both exits from Interstate 95 has been converted to "big box" retailer use.

New Rochelle remains a center of business, home to the corporate headquarters of Sidney Frank Importing, Blimpies, East River Savings Bank, and Somnia Anesthesia Services.

== Parks and recreation ==
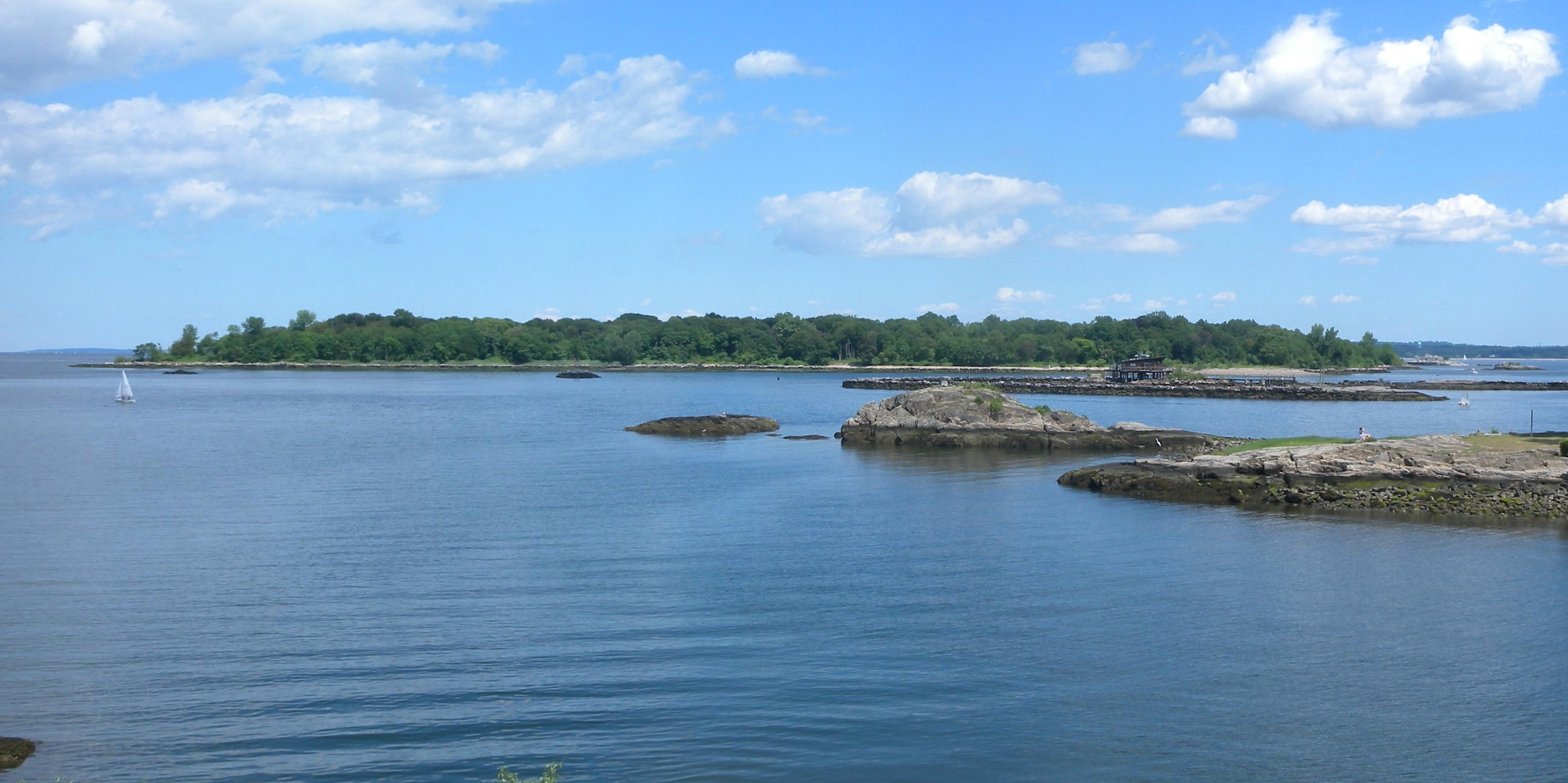
Islands along New Rochelle's waterfront

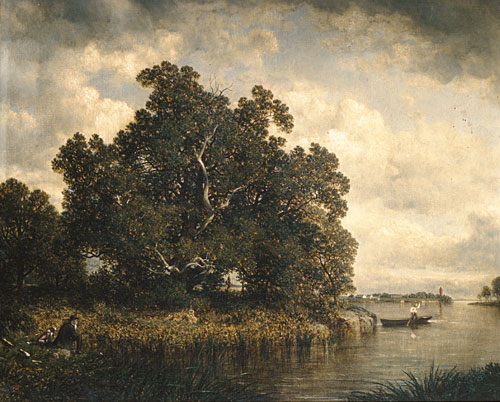
Bayside, New Rochelle, New York, by David Johnson, 1886

=== Waterfront ===
The shoreline of New Rochelle measures 2.7 miles (4.3 km), but due to many irregularities and off-shore islands, the actual length of the waterfront is 9.3 miles (15.0 km).

- Yacht, sailing and rowing clubs dot the coast on Long Island Sound and beach clubs line the shores of Davenport Neck. Beckwithe Point, the Greentree Country Club and the Surf Club are the largest of the private shore clubs, providing waterfront recreation to members during the summer season. The New York Athletic Club sits on Travers Island, located on the border of New Rochelle and Pelham Manor.
- Echo Bay Yacht Club and Huguenot Yacht Club are two well-known private yacht clubs in the city.
- New York Sailing School and New Rochelle Rowing Club, each of which has a history dating back over 100 years.
- The city operates a large marina with 300 slips and 150 mooring spaces.

=== Parks ===
The city has a collection of parklands and nature preserves, with 102.5 acres (0.415 km^{2}) of inland waters, 231.51 acres (0.9369 km^{2}) of public park lands and 168 acres (0.68 km^{2}) of park lets.

- Glen Island – In 1879, John H. Starin, a former US Congressman and New York transportation king, bought five islands which he named 'Glen Island' and created perhaps the first theme park open to the public. His 12 steamboats transported millions of New York residents and others to the attractions which included a zoo, a natural history museum, a railway, a German beer garden (around the castle-like structure which still stands today), a bathing beach, and a Chinese pagoda. Today the park is a 105-acre (0.42 km^{2}) island property connected to the mainland by a drawbridge built in the 1920s. One of the main features of the park is its pristine, crescent-shaped beach offering access to Long Island Sound.
- Five Islands Park is a series of islands connected by small footbridges and pathways and offers playground, sports, hiking and camping facilities for all residents to enjoy.
- Hudson Park encompasses 13 acres (0.053 km^{2}) along the city's harbor front and includes a beach for residents, the city boathouse, greenhouses, the shore station of the United States Coast Guard and several yacht and rowing clubs. The park is traditionally accepted as the original landing place of the Huguenot settlers. A granite boulder with bronze tablets commemorates the event.
- Davids Island, a 78-acre (320,000 m^{2}) island off the coast of the city, is being transformed from a former American military base (Fort Slocum) into a park and environmental preserve. Beginning just after the Civil War, the island was a military base used to protect New York Harbors, during World War I it served as an army recruitment station and up until 1967, it maintained various 'Cold War' facilities. Today it is home to a variety of plants, birds, and animals. These include the endangered Kemp's ridley sea turtle, and rare birds such as osprey and least terns. Davids Island also supports valuable wetlands, rare rocky intertidal areas, and sandy beaches. The waters surrounding the Island are home to Winter Flounder, Atlantic Herring, and Atlantic Silversides.
- Ward Acres, located in the North End, is a combination of untouched forest, wild lawns and meadows, acres of hiking, exercise trails and historic horse stables/cemeteries. In 2007, The Westchester County Department of Conservation produced a Natural Resource Management Plan in order to identify and protect the natural resource needs of the park. It encompasses 62 acres (250,000 m^{2}), with the forests divided into four main sections, each distinct in both general characteristics and species presence. It is formed by a portion of a former private estate that contained a horse farm, and by an old railroad right of way. It includes a 3-acre (12,000 m^{2}) fenced-in dog run, and it is the only park in the City in which residents can walk a dog without a leash.
- The Leatherstocking Trail is a 2-mile (3.2 km) long, inter-municipal hiking trail situated between New Rochelle and Mamaroneck, eventually linking into Saxon Woods County Park. It is part of a larger "Colonial Greenway Trail" in which it connects to Twin Lakes/Nature Study and Saxon Woods parks.
- Sheldrake Lake which formerly served as a reservoir supplying the area's drinking water, is now a 60 acres (0.24 km^{2}) park and nature conservancy promoting an increased understanding of the local ecology.
- Twin Lakes Park, combined with the adjacent Nature Study Woods comprise 220 acres (0.89 km^{2}) of woods, marsh, lakes, ponds and some fields along the Hutchinson River in New Rochelle's North End. There are many foot trails weaving through woods, marshlands, fields and around two large lakes (formerly reservoirs).

=== Golf ===
- Wykagyl Country Club is located in the Wykagyl section of New Rochelle on North Avenue just south of Quaker Ridge Road. Golfweek magazine ranks Wykagyl as one of America's Top 100 Classic Courses.
- Pelham Country Club, straddles the border of New Rochelle and Pelham Manor. The course is a mile from the Westchester-New York City border and Pelham Bay Park.

=== Tennis ===
- New Rochelle Tennis Club, located in Wykagyl, is one of the oldest lawn-tennis organizations in the country.

== Government ==
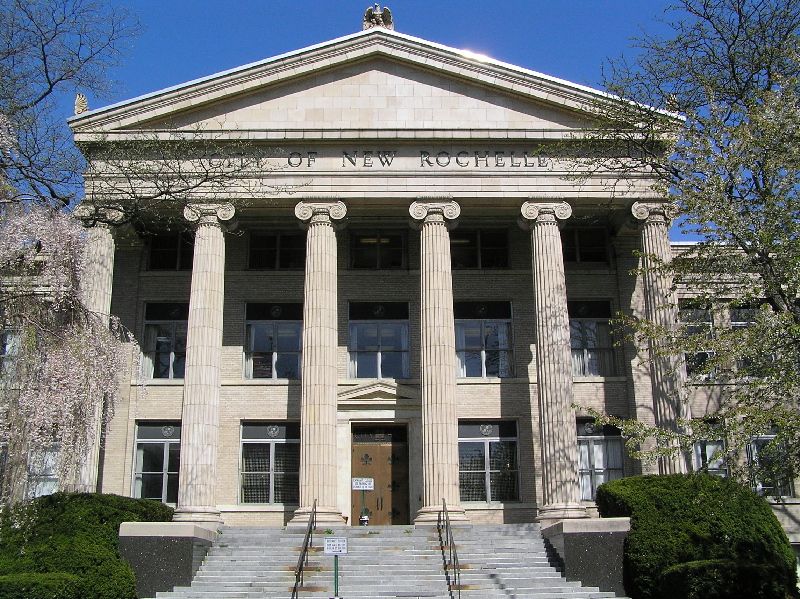
City Hall

Mayors of the City of New Rochelle
Mayor	Party	Term
Yadira Ramos-Herbert	Democratic	2024–present
Noam Bramson	Democratic	2006–2023
Timothy C. Idoni	Democratic	1992–2005
Leonard C. Paduano	Republican	1980–1991
Vincent R. Rippa	Democratic	1976–1979
Frank J. Garito	Republican	1971–1975
Stanley W. Church	Democratic	1970
Alvin R. Ruskin	Republican	1964–1970
Stanley W. Church	Democratic	1960–1963
George Vergara	Independent	1956–1959
Stanley W. Church	Democratic	1940–1955
Harry Scott	Republican	1935–1940
Charles F. Simmons	Republican	1935
Paul M. Crandell	Republican	1934–1935
Walter G. C. Otto	Democratic	1930–1934
Benjamin B. Badeau	Republican	1926–1929
Harry Scott	Republican	1920–1925
Frederick H. Waldorf	Democratic	1918–1919
Edward Stetson Griffing	Republican	1914–1917
Frederick H. Waldorf	Democratic	1912–1913
Harry E. Colwell	Republican	1910–1911
George G. Raymond	Democratic	1908–1909
Henry S. Clarke	-	1902–1907
Michael Dillon	Democratic	1899–1901
Source: Names and Dates Confirmed by Mayoral Portraits in New Rochelle City Hall

Since 1932, New Rochelle has operated under a Council-Manager form of government. The City Manager is the chief administrative officer of the city selected to carry out the directives of the Council. The Manager monitors the city's fiscal condition and enforces its ordinances and laws. The City Manager is involved in the discussion of all matters coming before Council yet has no final vote. The City Council is the legislative body consisting of the Mayor and six council members. The Mayor serves as the presiding officer of the Council. Since 1993, the City has had six council districts, with one council member elected from and by each district. The Council functions to set policy, approve the annual budget, appoint the City Manager and City Clerk, and enact local laws, resolutions and ordinances.

== Education ==
=== Public ===
The city is served by the City School District of New Rochelle, which operates a public high school, two middle schools, six elementary schools, and one pre-k through second grade Early Childhood Center. On seven occasions, the City's schools have received the prestigious Blue Ribbon Award from the U.S. Department of Education. New Rochelle High School is one of the most diverse high schools in the country; the student body represents over 60 countries from around the world. The school offers over 240 courses including honors, research and advanced placement courses.

Libraries are operated by the New Rochelle Public Library System which is part of the county-wide Westchester Library System.

=== Private ===
==== Primary and secondary ====
- Hudson Montessori – private Montessori school in Wykagyl serving pre-kindergarten level through fifth grade.
- Iona Preparatory School (Upper & Lower Schools) – all-boys Catholic school serving grades kindergarten through 12.
- Mount Tom Day School – private day school serving pre-k through second grade; housed mansion of artist J. C. Leyendecker.
- The Thornton Donovan School – co-ed preparatory school in Beechmont.
- The Ursuline School – all-girls Catholic school in Wykagyl serving grades six through 12.
- Salesian High School – all-boys Roman Catholic high school (grades nine through 12)

==== Higher education ====
- The College of New Rochelle – Was once the largest women's Catholic college in the United States, founded by the sisters of the Ursuline Order. It closed in 2019.
- Iona University – Catholic college founded by the Congregation of Christian Brothers.
- Mercy University – Acquired the College of New Rochelle in 2019 to become Mercy's New Rochelle campus.
- Monroe College – provides professional, career oriented and business centered education.

=== Miscellaneous education ===
The Japanese Weekend School of New York, a Japanese weekend school, has its offices in New Roc City in New Rochelle. As of 2006, the school had about 800 students, including Japanese citizens, and Japanese Americans, at locations in Westchester County and Long Island.

== Infrastructure ==
=== Transportation ===
==== Roads ====
Major highways include Interstate 95 and the Hutchinson River Parkway. Interstate 95 serves as the main route through New Rochelle, with four exits directly serving the city. The Hutchinson River Parkway, which is designated for passenger vehicles only, runs through much of the city. Substantial congestion on the parkway occurs in both directions during the morning and evening rush-hour.

The Boston Post Road, known as Main Street in downtown New Rochelle, is used as a major artery during the morning and evening commute. Most traffic via the Post Road is short distance or fairly local, yet vehicles have utilized Route 1 during times of heavy congestion on I-95 as a re-route.

==== Public transit ====
The city has a train station served by Metro North on the New Haven Line and Amtrak on the Northeast Corridor via its Northeast Regional train. The city is also served by the Bee-Line Bus System for local service. Adirondack Trailways provides interstate bus service.

Rail transit began in New Rochelle around 1848, when the New York & New Haven opened their line along Long Island Sound. After the Civil War, proposals for new railroads reached new levels. Banking that the city would continue to grow northward, the New York, Westchester and Boston Railway Company was established to serve the large populations moving to the suburbs. Two main lines were built as part of the NYW&B; the Port Chester line and the White Plains line. While the populations of some communities served by the NYW&B did grow between 1912 and 1937, the growth was not sufficient or fast enough to provide adequate business for the railroad, and service was discontinued on December 31, 1937.

==== Air travel ====
Westchester County is served by Westchester County Airport. Additionally, New Rochelle is easily accessed by New York City airports (JFK, LaGuardia), and New Jersey's Teterboro and Newark Airport.

=== Emergency services ===
==== Fire ====
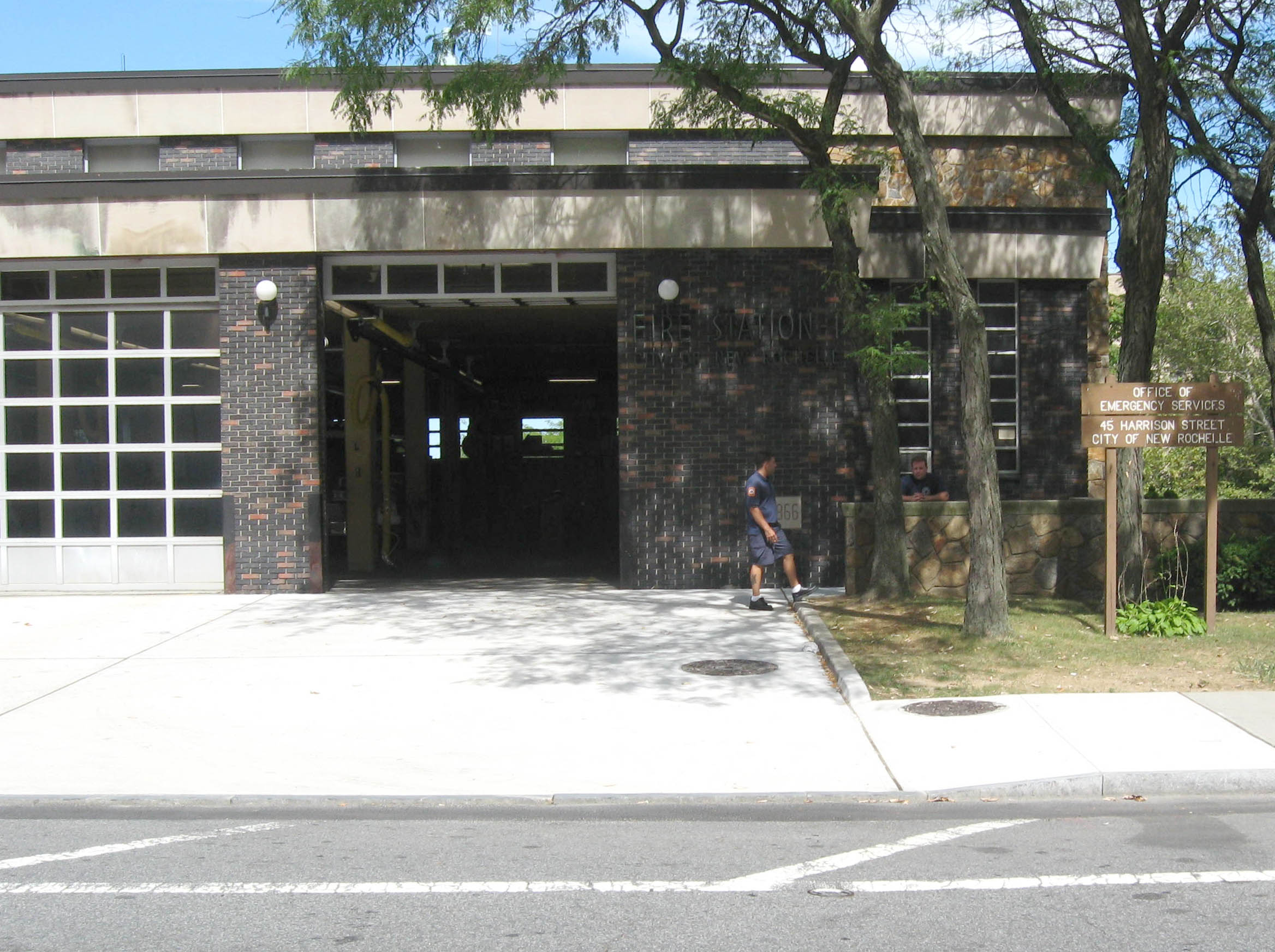
Fire station

The New Rochelle Fire Department (NRFD) provides fire protection and first responder emergency medical services to the city of New Rochelle. The New Rochelle Fire Department responds to approximately 8,000 emergency calls annually. The city also contracts with a commercial ambulance service, Transcare Emergency Medical Ambulance Services, to provide dedicated ALS Ambulances to the city 24/7, 365. Two ambulances from Transcare EMS are stationed at two New Rochelle Fire Department firehouses in the southern and northern sections of the city. The New Rochelle Fire Department is sub-divided into two main divisions of operation: Fire and Emergency Operations, and Support Services. Each of these divisions is commanded by a Deputy Chief.

The Fire and Emergency Operations Division is commanded by four Deputy Chiefs, one per shift/squad, who reports to the Chief of Department/Fire Commissioner. This division supervises the department's eight fire companies and 155 uniformed members.

The NRFD currently operates out of five fire stations, located throughout the city, under the command of one Deputy Chief/Tour Commander per shift. The New Rochelle Fire Department also operates and maintains a fire apparatus fleet of five engines, three ladders, one rescue, and numerous special, support, and reserve units. In addition to the five fire stations, the NRFD also operates a Fire Headquarters administrative building.

==== Police ====
The Town of New Rochelle formed its first professional police department in 1885, 14 years before the city incorporated in 1899. The department currently has 186 sworn officers and a total staff of more than 250. In 1993, the department was certified as an accredited agency by the New York State Law Enforcement Accreditation Council. Special programs include community oriented policing through the 'Police and Community Together' (PACT) program, harbor patrol, and a bicycle patrol.

==== Health care ====
Sound Shore Medical Center, also known as Montefiore New Rochelle Hospital, is a not-for-profit health care organization located in New Rochelle that treats over 85,000 patients annually and operates the only New York State Area Trauma Center in southern Westchester County.

Ambulance service is provided by Transcare EMS, which operates three Paramedic-staffed Medic Ambulances throughout the city.

== Popular culture ==
=== Studios ===
In the early 20th century, New Rochelle was home to one of the first movie studios in the country, Edwin Thanhouser's Thanhouser Film Corporation. Originally located on the corner of Warren and Grove Street, the company moved to Main Street near Echo Avenue after a devastating fire in 1913. The studio is noted for filming the first serial in motion pictures, named The Million Dollar Mystery.

Terrytoons animation studio was located in New Rochelle from 1928 to 1968. Its most popular characters include Mighty Mouse, Gandy Goose, Dinky Duck, Deputy Dawg, Luno and Heckle and Jeckle.

=== In films and television ===
- Dr. Jekyll and Mr. Hyde (1912) was filmed in New Rochelle.
- Scenes in Goodfellas were filmed in the city.
- The 1996 romantic comedy Love Is All There Is was filmed at the Greentree Country Club on Davenport Neck.
- The Oranges, a Hugh Laurie movie, has scenes filmed inside two homes in the Beechmont neighborhood.
- In The Post, Kay Graham (Meryl Streep) home's exterior was filmed at a home on Beechmont Avenue.
- In The Dick Van Dyke Show, the Petrie family made their home at 148 Bonnie Meadow Road in New Rochelle.

== Sister city ==
New Rochelle's sister city is La Rochelle, a city and commune of western France. There has been a "friendly relationship" between the two cities since 1910.

== See also ==
- National Register of Historic Places listings in New Rochelle, New York
- List of people from New Rochelle, New York
