= List of neighborhoods in New Rochelle, New York =

New Rochelle, New York occupies an area of roughly 10.5 square miles in Southern Westchester County, bounded on the south by Long Island Sound; on the west by Pelham Manor, Pelham and Eastchester; on the north by Scarsdale; and on the east by Scarsdale, Mamaroneck and Larchmont.

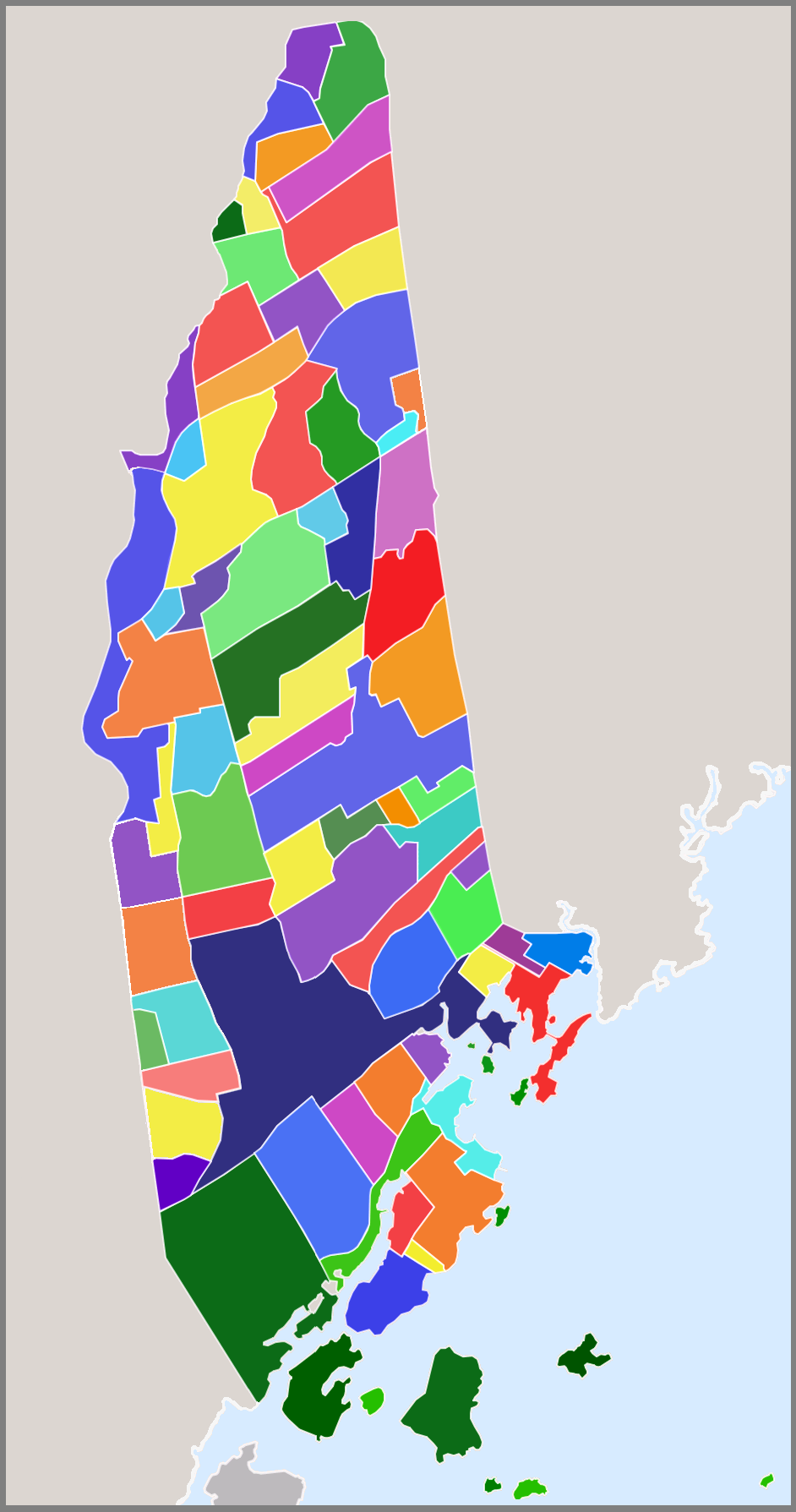

An interactive map of some of New Rochelle's neighbourhoods

For nearly two centuries from its settlement in 1688, New Rochelle was a quiet farming community with a bustling water dependent commercial center. Its proximity to the Sound had resulted in a booming resort trade by the late 1800s and wealthy Manhattanites flocked to the city's shores for recreation and relaxation. In 1889, The Town and Village of New Rochelle were incorporated as one city with a population of 14,000 residents. Just three decades later, New Rochelle's population had grown to over 54,000, having become one of the most sought after suburban communities in the country. The community's expansion of infrastructure and neighborhoods kept pace with the mushrooming population. These early suburban neighborhoods were extremely popular with commuters, a new segment of American society choosing to live outside of the urban center and travel in daily for work. Developers immediately set to the task of providing them with fine homes and desirable communities on the waiting large tracts of farmland. Beginning with the southern tier of town, planned residential communities spread across the City, ultimately earning it the nickname "City of Homes".

The natural beauty and diverse geography of the area greatly influenced the primarily residential development of throughout most of the city, evidenced by the more than fifty 'residential parks' found today. Some of the country's most expensive residential real estate can be found in New Rochelle as well: The Wykagyl 10804 postal code covering much of the City's North End is ranked on Forbes magazine's annual '500 most expensive zip-codes' list, with an average household income of $199,061 and an average home price over $752,000. In the city's southern end, homes in the gated waterfront enclave Premium Point can cost anywhere from $2 to $20 million.

The Downtown and South End, in contrast, are quite densely populated, with many multi-family residential complexes and high rise apartment buildings. There are more than 11,500 single family units within the city, more than neighboring Larchmont, Mamaroneck and Scarsdale combined. The total number of households surpasses 26,000, more than that of neighboring Pelham, Pelham Manor, Eastchester, Scarsdale, Mamaroneck and Larchmont combined.

The city is served by zip-codes 10801, 10802, 10804, 10805 and 10583, with a small number of New Rochelle homes served by 10538.

== City ==
New Rochelle - maps: road • satellite • terrain

== Zip-code areas ==
- New Rochelle map
- 10801 - maps: road • satellite
- 10804 - maps: road • satellite
- 10805 - maps: road • satellite
- 10583 - maps: road • satellite

== City Center ==
Located south of the City's North End and north of New Rochelle's Downtown, the central area contains some of the City's oldest planned neighborhoods as well as New Rochelle's City Hall. This entirety of this region is served by the 10801 zip code.

=== Chatsworth ===
Chatsworth is a middle-class residential neighborhood adjacent to the City Park athletic fields. The area of 'Chatsworth' originated along the Town of Mamaroneck/City of New Rochelle border half a mile to the east. The region included land within both communities, including portions of what is now the eastern end of Beechmont as well as the southern part of Larchmont Woods. The Chatsworth - City Park Association is the neighborhood association that serves Chatsworth. The neighborhood includes Chatsworth Place, Ashland Street, East Place, and the eastern side of Crestview Street.

=== Chauncey Estates ===
A community located between North Avenue and Webster Avenue, the Chauncey Estates area consists of older homes zoned from the early 1900s. The Chauncey Estates Neighborhood Association serves the area east of Glenwood Lake and west of Halcyon Park and includes Chauncey Avenue, Hilltop Avenue, Leffingwell Place, Schudy Place, Thomas Place, and parts of Clinton Avenue, Clove Road, Coligni Avenue, Mount Joy Place, North Avenue, and Webster Avenue.

=== Fifth Avenue Park ===
Fifth Avenue Park was a residential park developed along Plain Avenue, bounded by Fifth Avenue and the New England Thruway, and Mamaroneck and Portman Road.

=== French Ridge ===
Located south of the Glenwood Lake neighborhood and west of Webster Avenue, the French Ridge neighborhood is currently up for review as a National Historic District. The French Ridge neighborhood includes Risley Place, Wood Place, French Ridge, and the southern extent of Calhoun Avenue.

- Webster Ridge: Webster Ridge is a term sometimes used to refer to the French Ridge neighborhood.

=== Glenwood Lake ===
Glenwood Lake is a neighborhood of relatively small lots with modest houses built during the 1920s and after. Included within this area is the former Bergholtz Estate, which was sold to John Muir in the 1920s and was subsequently subdivided and built with homes built in the Colonial, Tudor and Mediterranean styles. Glenwood Lake is located near the Pelham line in the western portion of this area. Much of the activity of this area is centered on Webster School, a wonderful example of WPA construction during the 1930s. This Glenwood Lake neighborhood is bounded on the south by Lincoln Avenue, on the east by Webster Avenue, on the north by Mayflower Avenue, and on the west by Pelham. A small section of the neighborhood extends north of Mayflower Avenue to include Troy Lane, and another section extends south of Lincoln Avenue to include a semi-circular section along Glenwood Avenue, Glenwood Place, and Oakdale Avenue. Daniel Webster Elementary School, a public school in the City School District of New Rochelle that offers a humanities magnet program, is located in this neighborhood.

- Winyah Park: The former estate of Col. Richard Lathers and site of Lather's Hill community of Alexander Jackson Davis designed gothic-revival cottages and villas, most of Winyah Park, also known as "Winyahwood", eventually became part of the Glenwood Lake neighborhood, with a small section developing into the French Ridge neighborhood.

=== Halcyon Park ===
The Halcyon Park neighborhood is located east of North Avenue, north of Fifth Avenue, and south of the Iona University campus. The neighborhood includes Belleview Place, Brookside Place, Durand Street, Halcyon Terrace, Howard Parkway, Hubert Place, Lorenz Avenue, President Street, Sidney Street, Treno Street, Koch Street, and the northern extent of Brookdale Avenue.

=== Hillcrest ===
The Hillcrest neighborhood is bounded by Fifth Avenue to the south, Halcyon Park to the west, Chatsworth to the east, and Beechmont to the north.

- Congress Park: An area within the Hillcrest neighborhood, Congress Park includes State Street and Congress Street.
- Sunset View Park: Neighborhood in the Hillcrest area located north of 5th Avenue, along Dewey Avenue, Ellenton Avenue, Schley Avenue, and Hillcrest Avenue.

=== Huguenot Heights ===
Huguenot Heights is a neighborhood located east of Webster Avenue and south of the Huguenot Park neighborhood. The neighborhood includes Fern Street, Faneuil Place, Rotunno Place, and sections of Hillside Avenue, Irving Place, Clinton Avenue, and Gramercy Place.

=== Kress Park ===
Kress Park is a historic, early 20th century residential park. Kress Park is located along Kress Avenue, Woodbine Avenue, and Crosby Place, south of the Chauncey Estates neighborhood and east of the Glenwood Lake neighborhood. (Boundary: Webster Avenue from Lincoln Avenue to Kress Avenue inclusive).

=== Petersville ===
An early community which included portions of what's now City Park properties and the Parkside Place apartment complex, located between Fifth Avenue and Beechmont Woods, and abutting Mamaroneck.

=== Rochelle Park-Rochelle Heights Historic District ===
Spanning two neighborhoods, this district was listed on the U.S. National Register of Historic Places in 2005.

- Rochelle Heights: Established in 1905 on the former estate of George G. Sickles, a Wall Street financier, plans were developed by New York City architects Mann, MacNellie and Lindeberg, including lots and homes in a wide range of sizes. The Rochelle Park neighborhood includes Albermarle Avenue, The Boulevard East, Brookdale Avenue, Brookdale Circle, Cortlandt Avenue, Earle Place, Hamilton Avenue, Hunter Avenue, Lempke Place, Pierce Street, Putnam Street, Rockland Place, Slocum Street, and parts of Orchard Place, Beufort Place, Fifth Avenue, and The Serpentine (Boundary: Fifth Avenue, Rochelle Park, North Avenue).
- Rochelle Park: The Rochelle Park neighborhood lies directly behind New Rochelle's City Hall. Originally designed to cover a rectangular area, the southeast corner of Rochelle Park was clipped during the construction of I-95, which runs through the center of New Rochelle. The Rochelle Park neighborhood includes The Boulevard, The Circle, The Court, Manhattan Avenue, Manor Place, and parts of The Serpentine, Beufort Place, and Orchard Place (Boundary: North Avenue, Stephenson estate, Carpenter estate, Haskin estate (and others) and Sickles estate).
- Rockland Park: An area in the southeastern section of the Rochelle Heights-Rochelle Park Historic District, Rockland Park was a neighborhood developed along Potter Avenue, Glove Street, Bonnet Street, and Mill Road. This neighborhood was demolished to make way for I-95.

== Downtown ==
The Downtown area of New Rochelle is located north of the South End, west of the East End, and east of the West End. Huguenot Street and Main Street run through the middle of the Downtown and form the New Rochelle portion of U.S. Route 1. Unlike the other regions of the City, the Downtown contains primarily apartment buildings and retail space rather than residential parks. The area is currently the site of a number of development projects spurred by the City's adoption of a Downtown Overlay Zone.

=== Home Park ===
Home Park was a residential neighborhood that has now been largely incorporated into the City's Downtown. Home Park is bounded by Main Street to the south, Huguenot Street to the north, Harrison Street to the west, and Echo Avenue to the east.

== East End ==
The East End is an area bounded generally by the Downtown to the west and I-95 to the north. The term "the East End" is often used to refer to the specific residential area bounded by U. S. 1 (Post Road) on the south, the Town of Mamaroneck on the east, Palmer Avenue on the north, and River Street on the west. The southern section of this residential area is a middle-class neighborhood with properties dating from the early 1900s onward. It contains the City's only row houses, located on Stephenson Boulevard. Much of the area was originally owned by inventor John Stephenson and for some years early in the twentieth century was the home to workers involved with the Thanhouser Movie Studios nearby on Main Street.

=== Hazlehurst Park ===
Hazlehurst Park, also known as "Emerson Estates," is an early 20th century residential park situated along the Mamaroneck/New Rochelle border. Hazelhurst Park includes Emerson Avenue, Moran Place, Chester Avenue, and Emerson Point.

- Dillon Park: The Dillon Park section of Hazlehurst Park includes the New Rochelle portions of Chester Place and Moran Place that connect to the residential park developed along Dillon Road across the Mamaroneck Town border (Boundary: Boston Post Road at Mamaroneck Town line).

=== Homestead Park ===
Homestead Park, also known as "New Rochelle Homestead," is a residential area located in the eastern portion of New Rochelle. The area is bordered by Stephensen Boulevard to the east and Downtown New Rochelle on the west. The neighborhood includes Lincoln Street, Jackson Street, Rhodes Street, Pratt Street, Monroe Street, and Adams Street. Homestead Park is generally considered to include the neighborhing developments of Homestead Place, along the street of the same name, and Pine Park, along Acorn Terrace and Fir Place, which were clipped by the expansion of Palmer Avenue south of I-95. Along with the Stephenson Park neighborhood, Homestead Park is served by the East End Civic Association.

=== Premium Point ===
Premium Point is an exclusive, gated community in the southeastern end of the City on the Long Island Sound. The Premium Point neighborhood is divided between the City of New Rochelle and the Town of Mamaroneck. The New Rochelle section includes Premium Point, Central Drive, and East Drive. This area spans the border with the neighboring Village of Larchmont. The homes here range from 2 - 20 million dollars.

=== Premium Point Park ===
Premium Point Park is waterfront community on Echo Bay between the gated Premium Point community on the east and the campus of Salesian High School and Five Islands Park on the west. The Premium Point Park Association, founded in 1922, is a dues-paying association that provides and maintains upkeep on its common properties including park land along the shore, recreational space, and docks for waterfront access. The neighborhood includes Cherry Avenue, Highview Avenue, Seaview Avenue, Hawthorne Drive, Agar Drive, and Dock Pathway Street.

=== Pryor Manor ===
Located on the Pryer Marshes and Wetlands along the Larchmont Village border, the Pryor Manor neighborhood is a community characterized by stately Tudor and Mediterranean homes and winding roadways. The Pryor Manor Association is the neighborhood association that covers the New Rochelle portion of the neighborhood, which includes Pryor Manor Road, Dogwood Lane, Doherty Place, and Wildwood Circle.

=== Spencer Park ===
The Spencer Park neighborhood lies north and east of the Sun Haven neighborhood along the Mamaroneck Town border.

=== Stephenson Park ===
Adjoining Homestead Park, this community was formerly Crystal Lake, a large body of water once used to supply much of New York City with ice. The lake was later filled in after concerns of mosquito-borne disease developing in its stagnant water. The neighborhood lies mostly east of Stephenson Boulevard and includes Petersville Road, Lispenard Avenue, High Street, Sherman Street, Halligan Street, Dearborn Street, Lyons Place, Hertford Street, Pembroke Street, Grant Street, Merton Street, Jefferson Street, and Madison Street. Along with the Homestead Park neighborhood, Stephenson Park is served by the East End Civic Association.

=== Sun Haven ===
Bordered by Boston Post Road and Palmer avenue, the Sun Haven neighborhood is located at the eastern edge New Rochelle along the Mamaroneck Town border. Sun Haven includes Sun haven Drive, Evergreen Avenue, Belmont Avenue, Lasalle Drive, Wilson Drive, Harding Drive, and Cooper Drive. The neighborhood is served by the Sun Haven Association.

- Stonelea Park: Originally developed as a single-street residential park along Stonelea Place, this area now forms the western portion of the Sun Haven neighborhood alongside the eastern edge of the Stephenson Park neighborhood.

== North End ==
The North End of New Rochelle is defined as north of Eastchester Road in the western area of the City and north of Barnard Road in the eastern section. Most of the North End is served by the 10804 zip code in the area coterminous with the Wykagyl hamlet, while the farthest north part of the region is served by the Scarsdale 10583 zip code.

=== Bayberry Park ===
Bayberry is an upper-middle-class neighborhood of ranch, split-level, and colonial style homes established in 1954. Located in the northern end of the city, the community originally attracted attention as the only new home colony in Westchester with its own recreation facilities including swimming pools, basketball courts, tennis courts, a playground and day camp, and a clubhouse. Sheldrake Lake nature preserve and adjacent Goodliffe Pond border the community on the north while the Leatherstocking Nature Trail and woodlands border it on the east. Pinebrook Boulevard runs directly west of Bayberry, and the eastern edge of the neighborhood lies on the Mamaroneck Town border. The Bayberry neighborhood includes Bayberry Lane, Pine Park Drive, Woodhollow Lane, Highridge Road, Old Country Road, Split Rock Lane, Woodcut Lane, Stony Run, and Hunt Path.

=== Beechmont ===
Eugene Lambden and his brother John planned the first part of the Beechmont neighborhood in 1902 for the City Realty Company. The neighborhood is centered on Beechmont Lake, created in 1902 by damming Pine Brook. Beechmont lies on the eastern side of New Rochelle, bordering the town of Mamaroneck. Rochelle Heights is immediately to the south of Beechmont, while Forest Heights, Forest Knolls, and Paine Heights are to the north and Larchmont Woods and Forest Knolls are to the northeast. North Avenue forms the extreme western boundary. The Beechmont neighborhood includes Beechmont Drive, Montgomery Circle, Lester Place, The Esplanade, Pryer Terrace, Pryer Place, Overlook Circle, Pell Place, Beechmont Place, Hillside Lane, Hillside Crescent, Barnard Road, Rockledge Place, Melrose Drive, Eck Place, Aviemore Drive, Glenbrook Drive, Stone Cabin Road, Normandy Lane, Acorn Lane, Dell Way, and parts of Pinebrook Boulevard, Forest Avenue, Woodlawn Avenue, and Mountain Avenue. Henry Barnard Early Childhood Center, a public school in the City School District of New Rochelle that offers a pre-kindergarten through Second grade magnet program, is located in this neighborhood.

- Beechmont Garden/Beechmont Knolls: Subsection of the Beechmont neighborhood east of Beechmont Lake, including Barnard Road, Rockledge Place, Stone Cabin Road, and Dell Way.
- Beechmont Woods: Eastern end of Beechmont located directly south of Forest Knolls, including the eastern half Beechmont Drive and the entirety of Melrose Drive.

=== Bloomingdale Estates ===
This neighborhood is an upscale residential 1980s development on the former private Bloomingdale estate. Bloomingdale Estates is located north of Wilmot Road and includes Country Ridge Road, Elmridge Drive, and Carriage Court.

- Northwood Knolls: Northwood Knolls is a neighborhood located north of Wilmot Road and west of the Bloomingdale Estates neighborhood. This neighborhood includes Bloomingdale Drive and Floren Place.

=== Bonnie Crest ===
Located to the north of Wykagyl's business district, development in this area was first conceived in 1910 when "Upper Rochelle" was entirely farmland. The small hamlet of Cooper's Corner served as the satellite to the downtown area for farmers living in the area. The real estate group that purchased all of the farmland to create the neighborhood were motivated by the construction of the New York-Westchester-Boston Railroad line and creation of a Wykagyl station nearby for potential commuters. The railroad was responsible for the growth of Wykagyl, its business district, and many of the large residential parks in the area. Main thoroughfares in Bonnie Crest include Belleau Drive, Fenimore Road, Broadfield Road, Mildred Parkway, Lovell Road, Taymill Road, and Victory Boulevard.

- Victory Park: Victory Park forms a section of the Bonnie Crest neighborhood.
- New Bonnie Crest: This area of the Bonnie Crest neighborhood includes Hanson Lane, Beverly Road, Morrison Drive, and Aurora Lane.

==== Ward Acres ====
This community, known as "Ward Acres," "Ward Acres Homes," or "Bonnie Crest Neighbors," lies adjacent to the Ward Acres forest and preservation area. William B. Ward Elementary School, a public school in the City School District of New Rochelle, is located alongside this neighborhood.

- Woodlands: Located in the Ward Acres section of the Bonnie Crest area, Woodlands contains Van Etten Blvd., Carol Lane, James Drive, and Robert Drive.

=== Daisy Farms ===
This neighborhood is a 1950s residential development of single family homes in the northern section of the city. The north end property was once the "Great", Daisy Farms, a working farm and equestrian estate (home to the Hutchinson Riding Academy), situated east of the old Wilmot Road leading to Scarsdale. The farm, owned by Adrian Iselin, Jr., became the centerpiece of the Adelin Property Corporation - hundreds of adjacent acres amassed by the millionaire in the 1920s in preparation for new development following the community's steady growth northward. This, however, did not happen for several decades due to the Great Depression and World War II. The Berne Construction Company of White Plains acquired the property in 1951 on which it constructed over 300 single family ranch style homes of spacious lots. A 12-acre parcel was acquired by the City for a North End School, the present day George M. Davis Elementary School. The Daisy Farms neighborhood includes Cerreta Lane, Darling Avenue, Dora Lane, Gladstone Road, Iselin Drive, Lambert Lane, Leslie Place, Old Farm Road, Retiro Lane, Turner Drive, and parts of Daisy Farms Drive, Grand Boulevard, Hutchinson Boulevard, Rogers Drive, and Wilmot Road.

=== Dorchester Hills ===
One of the two northernmost neighborhoods in New Rochelle, Dorchester Hills is bordered on the south by Wilmot Woods, on the west by Scarsdale Downs and Scarsdale Park, and on the north and east by the Heathcote section of the Village of Scarsdale. The Dorchester Hills neighborhood includes Dorchester Road, Severn Street, Morris Lane South, Wiltshire Road, Abbey Close, Malvern Lane, Baldwin Lane, and parts of Wilmot Road.

=== Forest Heights ===
The Forest Heights development dates from the early twentieth century, located south of the Broadview section of the Paine Heights neighborhood. Most homes in this area date from the teens and 1920s. The area is characterized by estate-scale homes on large lots. Architectural styles prevalent within this area include Colonial Revival, English Tudor Revival and French Norman Revival. Forest Heights is bounded by North Avenue to the west, Paine Heights to the north, and the Beechmont neighborhood to the south and east. The Forest Heights neighborhood includes Elk Avenue, Crawford Terrace, Antler Place, Forest Place, Forest Circle, and the portion of Forest Avenue west of Pinebrook Boulevard.

=== Highland Park ===
A residential area located in the Wykagyl section of northern New Rochelle, the area is bordered by Wykagyl Crossways on the north, Interlaken on the west, Huguenot Park on the south, and Paine Heights on the east. The area is situated just north of the Mahlstedt family's ice lakes which operated at North Avenue and Eastchester Road through the early 1900s. The surrounding land remained as undeveloped meadows and farmland through the turn of the Twentieth Century when planning for Highland Park began. Maps from 1901 display sections of farmland crisscrossed by lines representing streets. Named for the Highland region of Scotland and identified by Scottish names such as Aberfoyle, Calton, Inverness, and Perth, the new roads were lined with spacious lots on which large single-family homes were built. The Highland Park neighborhood includes Perth Avenue, Argyle Avenue, Calton Road, Braemar Avenue, Glenfruin Avenue, Glenorchy Place, Errol Place, Inverness Road, Apline Road, Aberfoyle Road, Portnellan Avenue, Calton Lane, Cameron Place, Lomond Place, and Brewster Terrace.

=== Huguenot Park ===
Huguenot Park is an early 20th century residential park. New Rochelle High School, the public high school in the City School District of New Rochelle, is located alongside this neighborhood.

- Lake Forest Park: The Lake Forest Park development forms part of the Huguenot Park area and includes Parcot Avenue, Bailey Place, Otsego Avenue, and parts of Clove Road, Eastchester Road, and Webster Avenue (Boundary: Webster Avenue north of Eastchester Road).

=== Hutchinson Park ===
Hutchinson Park is a small community located at the city's northern tip along the Eastchester Town border. The area consists of homes built primarily during the late 1950s through the 1970s. The homes reflect the mid-20th century ranch style. The neighborhood is located along Charlotte Lane, Vivian Drive, and Frederick Lane.

=== Twin Lakes / Nature Study Woods ===
Residential neighborhood located along the western edge of the City and bounded by Eastchester Road on the south, Webster Avenue on the east, and the Hutchinson River on the west. The neighborhood contains a mixture of architectural types, generally dating from the 1920s, including a significant concentration of Colonial and Tudor Revival-style homes built onto small lots laid out in an overall grid pattern. Many of the streets contain speculative houses built by contractors and developers of the day. A small number of homes from the City's early history are found within this area, remnants from the era prior to the creation of residential neighborhoods through subdivision. Included among these is the Parcot-Drake House.

- Interlaken: Interlaken is a residential park straddling the western edge of New Rochelle near the Eastchester Town border.

=== Kensington Woods ===
This neighborhood is a gated community in the north-western section of the city adjacent to Bonnie Crest, Lake Isle and Eastchester. The area consists of modern colonial homes which range from 1 - 1.8 million dollars (as per 2012).

=== Lake Isle ===
Located along the eastern side of the former reservoir 'Lake Isle', the community consists of lakefront homes and estates and continues into neighboring Eastchester as well.

=== Larchmont Woods ===
Larchmont Woods is a community located north and east of the Beechmont neighborhood and south of the Leatherstocking trail, along the Mamaroneck Town border. Forest Avenue is a main artery that runs through the three smaller neighborhoods within this area.

- Larchmont Woods: This residential area, known as Larchmont Woods or The Woods of Larchmont, is bounded by the Mamaroneck Town limits on the east, Forest Knolls and Rouken Glen on the north, and by Beechmont on the south and west. It consists of homes of varied scales, erected during the 1930s, 1940s, and 1950s, as older residential parks within the City were built out. The Larchmont Woods neighborhood includes Maywood Road, Wildwood Road, Mulberry Lane, Lotus Road, Linwood Road, Beech Road, Poplar Road, Springdale Road, Ridge Road, Highpoint Road, and parts of Woodlawn Avenue, Forest Avenue, Kingsbury Road, and Mountain Avenue.
- Forest Knolls: Bordered by Beechmont and Larchmont Woods on the south and Rouken Glen on the east. The Forest Knolls neighborhood includes London Terrace, Rugby Road, Devonshire Road, Pebbleway Road, Larchwood Road, Forest Court, and parts of Forest Avenue, Woodlawn Avenue, Kingsbury Road, Maywood Road.
- Rouken Glen: Situated along the New Rochelle/Mamaroneck Town border with portions in both communities, the New Rochelle portion of Rouken Glen, also known as "Woodacres," lies north of Larchmont Woods and east of Forest Knolls. The New Rochelle part of Rouken Glen includes Highwood Avenue, Knollwood Drive, and Beechtree Drive. This neighborhood is served by the 10538 area code.

=== Maplewood-Rosedale ===
This area of New Rochelle is served by the Maplewood-Rosedale neighborhood association and includes Seton Drive, Ralph Road, Gaby Lane, Short Lane, Rita Lane, and most of Surrey Drive.

- Maplewood Estates: 1950s era residential development in the city's north end
- Rosedale: 1950s era residential development situated in the northern end of the city, bordered by the Hutchinson River Parkway and Bonnie Crest to the south.

=== Northfield ===
Also known as "Northridge," this neighborhood is a small residential community located west of the Wykagyl business district. The Northfield neighborhood includes Northfield Road, Chatham Road, Stratford Road, Old Orchard Road, Mereland Road, Edna Place, and Upland Road.

=== Paine Heights ===
Sometimes referred to as "Tom Paine Heights," this neighborhood was developed on the 320 acres of land presented as a gift to Thomas Paine for his service in the American Revolution. This area became an early 20th century residential development of large homes along wide boulevards. Paine Heights is located north of Forest Heights and south of Wykagyl Park, between North Avenue and Pinebrook Boulevard. The Thomas Paine Cottage, a museum and historical center created out of the former home of the Founding Father, is located in this neighborhood. The Paine Heights neighborhood includes Paine Avenue, Broadview Avenue, Lyncroft Road, Longvue Avenue, Sicard Avenue, and Bayeau Road.

- Lyncroft: Early 20th century residential park consisting of Tudor, Mediterranean and Colonial estate homes in a wooded setting. Lyncroft is adjacent to Broadview and Wykagyl Park.
- Broadview: A development dating to 1906, Broadview forms the southern edge of the Paine Heights neighborhood.

=== Pineridge ===
Pineridge is a neighborhood located in northern end of the city adjacent to Ward Acres and Wykagyl Estates. The area features large ranch-style homes constructed in the 1960s. The Pineridge neighborhood includes Sussex Road, Alfred Lane, Avis Drive, Sara Lane, Fieldmere Street, and Albert Leonard Road. Albert Leonard Middle School, a public school in the City School District of New Rochelle, is located alongside this neighborhood.

=== Pinebrook ===
Bordered by the Ward Acres Reserve on the west and Scarsdale Village to the east, the Pinebrook area includes the subsections of Pinebrook Estates, Pinebrook Hollow, Quaker Hills, Hillandale, Brookwood, Brookridge, and Cherry Lawn.

- Brookwood: Brookwood is a private, gated neighborhood along Pinebrook Boulevard, north of Quaker Hills and south of the Hutchinson River Parkway.
- Hillandale: Bordered by Pinebrook Estates on the west, Cherry Lawn on the south and Scarsdale Village on the east.
- Pinebrook Estates: Constituting most of the Pinebrook area, the Pinebrook Estates neighborhood, also known as "Pinebrook Homes," is located directly east of Pinebrook Boulevard, north of Quaker Ridge Road, and south of the Quaker Hills neighborhood. The Pinebrook Estates neighborhood includes Aspen Road, Hayhurst Drive, Kenwood Drive, Saxon Way, Somerset Road, Tulip Lane, Ward Drive, Winding Brook Road, and parts of Hillandale Drive.
- Pinebrook Hollow: Pinebrook Hollow is a gated community located south of the Hutchinson River Parkway north of Quaker Hills near the northern end of Pinebrook Boulevard.
- Quaker Hills: Located in the northern section of the Pinebrook area of New Rochelle, Quaker Hills lies south of the Hutchinson River Parkway, adjacent to the former right of way of the New York, Westchester and Boston Railway and the former area of the Quaker Ridge stop on that train line. The Quaker Hills neighborhood includes Amherst Drive, Coutant Drive, Donald Drive, Hilary Circle, Nob Court, and parts of Ramona Court.

==== Brookridge ====
Brookridge is a private, gated community located off of Quaker Ridge Road near the Scarsdale border.

==== Cherry Lawn ====
Also known as The Greens at Cherry Lawn, this neighborhood is a gated community and is one of the newest communities to the City, planned around a central greenspace reminiscent of the classic 'town square' concept. The area was developed on the last remaining farmland in the city and the former location of the Cherry Lawn Driving Range.

=== Pinebrook Heights ===
Pinebrook Heights is the residential area located along the northern edge of Sheldrake Lake. The homes in Pinebrook Heights lie east of Pinberook Boulevard, south of Quaker Ridge Road, and west of the Scarsdale border. The Pinebrook Heights neighborhood includes Pengilly Drive, Dennis Drive, Arrowhead Lane, Richmond Lane, and Sheldrake Lane.

- Sheldrake Heights: Some of the homes in the Pinebrook Heights area directly adjacent to Sheldrake Lake are referred to as "Sheldrake Heights."

=== Quaker Ridge ===
Quaker Ridge is a residential neighborhood located along the Scarsdale Village border. The Quaker Ridge Improvement Company was organized for the development of the Quaker Ridge section of New Rochelle, backed by some of the wealthiest men in the Westchester real estate field. This development was the first one in the immediate "Quaker Ridge Station" area. The station constructed by the New York, Westchester & Boston Railway system was the nicest one on the entire line. The proximity to New York was a strong point of the station and the area, with commuters able to reach the southernmost point of Manhattan within fifty-three minutes or less. The Quaker Ridge property was seen as exceptionally well located for residential purposes. The property fronted on the Quaker Ridge Station, and intersected with wide, newly built drives and boulevards. A "trading section" set aside for the stores and shops at which residents were to shop, was also originally planned.

- Quaker Ridge Park: Also known as "Stratton Woods," the Quaker Ridge Park neighborhood is located north of the Hutchinson River Parkway and south of Stratton Hills, along the Scarsdale border. The Quaker Ridge Park neighborhood is served by the Stratton Woods Homeowners Association and includes Kewanee Road, Mohegan Place, Soulice Place, Arbor Drive, and parts of Pinebrook Boulevard, Stratton Road, and Weaver Street.

=== Scarsdale Downs ===
Scarsdale Downs is situated near the northernmost end of the City along the Scarsdale Village border, south of Scarsdale Park and north of Bloomingdale Estates. The Scarsdale Downs neighborhood includes Baraud Road North, Abingdon Lane, Atherstone Road, Tintern Lane, Winchchombe Way, Thornbury Road, Hawthorne Close, and part of Tewkesbury Road.

=== Scarsdale Park ===
Scarsdale Park is situated at the north-westernmost end of the city along the Scarsdale Village border. The Scarsdale Park neighborhood includes Candlewood Road, Sturbridge Place, Williamsburg Close, Sage Circle, and part of Tewkesbury Road.

=== Stratton Hills ===
Stratton Hills is a 1950s development found in the City's north end. The Stratton Hills neighborhood includes Donneybrook Road, Greentree Drive, Harlan Drive, Harvard Road, Iselin Drive, Jeffrey Place, Michael Drive, Reyna Lane, Runyon Place, Rutledge Road, Sheldrake Place, Shepherds Drive, Top O the Ridge Drive and parts of Daisy Farms Drive, Darling Ave, Grand Boulevard, Rogers Drive, Wilmot Road, and Weaver Street. George M. Davis Elementary School, a public school in the City School District of New Rochelle, is adjacent to this neighborhood.

=== Vaneck Estates ===
The Vaneck Estates neighborhood lies along Stratton Road near the Eastchester Town border. The neighborhood includes Regal Drive, Vaneck Drive, Wilputte Place, and parts of Stratton Road and Wilmot Road.

=== White Birches ===
White Birches is 1950s era residential development in the north end. White Birches is situated along Stratton Road, with Daisy Farms and Stratton Hills to the north, Quaker Ridge Park to the east, and Maplewood-Rosedale to the west. The White Birches neighborhood includes Ronbru Drive, Stuart Drive, Andrew Lane, Laron Drive, Stanton Circle, Marion Drive, and parts of Stratton Road and Surrey Drive.

=== Wilmot Woods ===
A residential community of approximately 150 Colonial and ranch style homes built starting in 1937, through the mid-1950's by the firm Haring & Blumethal, Wilmot Woods was modeled on the plan of the old New England villages, with a four-acre 'village green' located at the center of the tract. The streets bear names associated with early New England settlers. The Wilmot Woods neighborhood includes Alden Court, Baraud Road South, Ernest Drive, Livingston Road, Pilgrim Road, Plymouth Drive, Puritan Drive, and Revere Road.

=== Wykagyl Crossways ===
Wykagyl Crossways is an early to 20th century residential park characterized by average size Tudor, Mediterranean, and colonial homes on small lots. The neighborhood is located north of Highland Park and south of Northfield, stretching from North Avenue on the east to the Twin Lakes and Nature Study Woods Park on the west. The Wykagyl Crossways neighborhood includes Berrian Road, Bon Air Avenue, Disbrow Circle, Disbrow Lane, Elizabeth Road, Norman Road, Rose Lane, Rosehill Avenue, Seacord Road, Siebrecht Place, and parts of North Avenue and Webster Avenue.

- Bon Air Park: Located along Bon Air Avenue, east of Wykagyl Park between North Avenue and the Nature Study-Twin Lakes preserve, Bon Air Park was originally developed as a single-street residential park and now forms part of the Wykagyl Crossways neighborhood.
- Rose Hill: 1930s residential park bordered by Highland Park on the south. Around the turn of the 20th century the area was the home of the Rose Hill Nurseries & Greenhouses, a world renown domesticator of orchids and cultivator of rare and exotic flowers and plants.

=== Wykagyl Estates ===
Wykagyl Estates is a recent residential development located just north of Wykagyl Country Club. The area consists of late 20th century ranch homes, as well as contemporary 1990s structures, and was built as a "tennis community" centered on community courts and facilities. The Wykagyl Estates neighborhood includes Dusk Drive, Pondview Lane, and Skyview Lane.

=== Wykagyl Park ===
An early 20th century residential park developed by the Trenor Land Company, Wykagyl Park contains large estate-scale Tudor, Mediterranean and colonial revival style homes that are characteristic to the community. Wykagyl Park is bounded by North Avenue on the west, Paine Heights on the south, Pinebrook Boulevard on the east, and Wykagyl Country Club to the north. The Wykagyl Park neighborhood includes Avon Road, Cornell Place, Croft Terrace, Jerome Avenue, Overhill Road, Overlook Road, Oxford Place, Oxford Road, Ranger Place, Silver Birch Drive, Starr Terrace, Trenor Drive, Trevon Place, Valley Road, Wellington Road, and Wood Lane.

== Southside ==
The Southside, or South End, of New Rochelle is located west of Echo Bay and south of the Downtown. Most of the region lies south of Main Street, with the exception of the Sycamore Park and Woodside neighborhoods along the Pelham border, which are located north of Main Street and the Amtrak Acela train line but, like the rest of the South End, lies south of the Metro North New Haven Line. The South End of New Rochelle is served primarily by the 10805 zip code.

=== Anchorage ===
A waterfront enclave on Davenport Neck, Anchorage lies along the Titus Mill-Pond and Titus Mill-Pond State Tidal Wetlands. The Anchorage neighborhood includes 33 homes along part of Gail Drive, Clover Place, and Davenport Avenue. Anchorage residents have access to a common pool, recreational area, and marina facilities, which are all directly deeded at the time of purchase and for which dues are paid for upkeep.

=== Echo Manor ===
Echo Manor was subdivided to be a waterfront community on the western edge of Echo Bay, but the land is now used by the New Rochelle Treatment Plant.

=== Franklin Avenue ===
Also known as "Echo Heights," the Franklin Avenue neighborhood is a mixed residential/ commercial section Downtown, between Main Street on the north and Pelham Road on the south. The neighborhood includes Locust Avenue, Park Avenue, Bayview Avenue, Soundview Street, Fairview Place, Lafayette Street, Euclid Place, Alpha Place, and Acacia Terrace.

=== Homewood Park ===
Homewood Park is a neighborhood in New Rochelle bounded by Main Street to the north, the Franklin Avenue neighborhood to the east, Residence Park to the west, and Pelham Road on the south. Trinity Elementary School and Isaac E. Young Middle School, public schools in the City School District of New Rochelle, are located alongside this neighborhood.

=== Nautilus Park ===
Nautilus Park is a residential park developed along Nautilus Place.

=== Neptune Park ===
A neighborhood near the southwest edge of the city, Neptune Park is centered on Neptune Avenue, in close proximity to New Rochelle Harbor on the heights overlooking the Sound.

=== Residence Park ===
A historic residential park planned in the late 1880s, the historic character of Residence Park was asserted in a 2007 presentation about the area that was used to support a local historic district application to the Historic Landmarks Review Board of the city of New Rochelle. The presentation is available on the Residence Park neighborhood website. The Residence Park neighborhood includes the former main campus of the College of New Rochelle. (Boundary: Leland Avenue, Drake Avenue, Pelham Road, Main Street)

=== Sans Souci ===
Located in an area on Davenport Neck known as the Isle of Sans Souci, the Sans Souci neighborhood is named for the former Davenport estate of the Iselin family on which it was built. This waterfront community overlooks New Rochelle Harbor and Long Island Sound. The Sans Souci neighborhood includes Kensington Oval, Hampton Oval, Winchester Oval, Windor Oval, and Rodman Oval.

=== Sutton Manor ===
A unique enclave of homes dating back to the early 1900s, Sutton Manor is located along the western shore of Echo Bay. The neighborhood currently qualifies for designation as a Historic District. The primary roads in Sutton Manor are Sutton Manor Road, Farragut Circle, and Decatur Road (Boundary: Echo Road and Echo Avenue).

=== Sycamore Park ===
A neighborhood in the southwest corner of New Rochelle, Sycamore Park was developed by the Iselin family as affordable housing for the City's blue-collar working class population. This particular neighborhood contains the City's highest concentration of American Foursquares and is located north of Main Street and south of Kings Highway along the Pelham Manor border. The Beechwoods Cemetery and Holy Sepuchlre Cemetery are located directly across Kings Highway from this neighborhood. Sycamore Park includes Sycamore Avenue, Ronalds Avenue, Cleveland Avenue, Hill Street, Flower Street, Island View Place, Ronalds Lane, and Pelhamside Drive.

=== Woodside ===
Woodside is an area in the south end of New Rochelle, situated around the former site of the Woodside Station of the Harlem River and Port Chester Railroad. The Woodside Station was located north of Kings Highway, between Rockdale Avenue and Birch Street. The Beechwoods Cemetery and Holy Sepuchlre Cemetery are located to the west of this neighborhood.

== West End ==
A small neighborhood loosely defined on the southern border by Metro North's New Haven Line, on the west by the border with Pelham, on the north by Sickles Avenue, and on the east by Memorial Highway. It is defined by small building lots with little green space as compared to many other neighborhoods in the City. The principal thoroughfare is Union Avenue where many of the storefronts are located. Most of the neighborhood sits on a hill, which in the early days of New Rochelle was known as Dutch Hill, leading to the terminology of saying someone is "from up the West End." The neighborhood is and has traditionally been home to the city's larger immigrant populations, with Italian immigrants coming from 1900 through the 1960s and more recently Hispanic immigrants coming from about 1985 through the present. Although predominately Hispanic today, many remnants from the "Italian West" still exist, such as The Casa Calabria, Foresters Club and Saccone's Pizzeria. St. Joseph's Church, a cultural and religious mainstay of West New Rochelle, which was started and subsequently expanded by Italian immigrants, was merged with St. Gabriel's Church in 2015 and subsequently shuttered by the Archdiocese of New York in 2022 due to the Archdiocesan wide issue of declining attendance and revenue at many Roman Catholic Churches. This neighborhood is also home to Montefiore New Rochelle Hospital.

=== Edgewood Park ===
Located in the West End and originally called "St. Luke Place" and "Bryan Avenue," Edgewood Park is a horseshoe shaped street off Lockwood Avenue. This small neighborhood contains many Multi-family and single family houses. This street was the residence of former New Rochelle City Councilman McNamara, and Edgewood Park is currently home to former Councilman Trangucci.

=== Feeney Park ===
Feeney Park is middle-class neighborhood located in the City's west end along the Pelham border and includes the City owned park that shares the same name. Columbus Elementary School, a public school in the City School District of New Rochelle that offers a Science, Math, and Technology magnet program, is located in this neighborhood.

- Pelhamwood: Located along the Pelham border, this community had both a New Rochelle and Pelham section, with the New Rochelle section eventually evolving largely into the Feeney Park neighborhood.

== Hamlets and Secondary Areas ==
=== Cooper's Corner ===
For over two centuries Cooper's Corner served as an outpost for residents who lived in Upper New Rochelle miles from the downtown hub. The hamlet took shape at North Avenue and Mill Road near Burtis Mill that was powered by the Hutchinson River. It eventually included the general store of John Cooper, the 1795 Cooper's Corner School, the 1859 St. John's Wilmot Church, and the 1901 Wilmot Fire Station No. 6.

=== Davenport Neck ===
Historic waterfront peninsula originally inhabited by Siwanoy Indian tribes in the 1500s and 1600s. Over time the area became the summer vacation destination for wealthy New York families looking to retreat to impressive waterfront estates along Long Island Sound. Today the peninsula is home to a number of upscale residential communities and shore and yacht clubs.

=== Middletown ===
Middletown is a former hamlet of the Town of New Rochelle which covered portions of the community along North Avenue near Thomas Paine's Farm.

=== Wykagyl ===
Suburban section in north end of New Rochelle, conterminous with the 10804 zip-code. Wykagyl consists of sprawling, residential neighborhoods and natural green-space. Wykagyl is frequently used in reference to the small business district of retail stores, restaurants, offices and condominium developments located at the center of the community which serves as the "Downtown" for many Northenders. The construction of the New York-Westchester-Boston Railroad line through the sparsely populated north end of New Rochelle in 1912 and its creation of a Wykagyl stop and Station gave rise to an entirely new residential and business section of the city. To take advantage of the expanded commuting opportunities, "Wykagyl Gardens", one of the largest apartment complexes in the country at the time, was built adjacent to the station. The area's unusual name most likely resulted from the shortening of the name of an Algonquin tribe of Native Americans who originally inhabited the area.
