= Beechmont, New York =

Beechmont
- Populated place
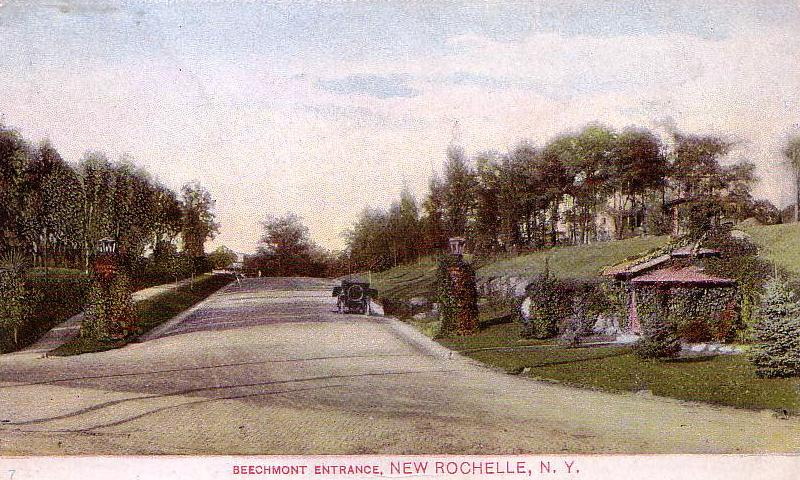
- Interactive map of Beechmont
- Coordinates: 40°55′43″N 73°47′3″W
- Country: United States
- State: New York
- County: Westchester
- Elevation: 846 ft (258 m)
- Time zone: UTC-5 (Eastern (EST))
  - Summer (DST): UTC-4 (EDT)
- ZIP codes: 10804
- GNIS feature ID: 943535

Beechmont (also known as Beechmont Knolls and Beechmont Woods) is an upscale residential community located in the northern end of New Rochelle in Westchester County, New York. Its boundaries are the Town of Mamaroneck on the east, Iona College, Sunset View Park, and City Park on the south, by Huguenot Park on the west and by Forest Heights, Larchmont Woods, and Bayberry on the north. Beechmont is within the larger Wykagyl sub-section of New Rochelle, served by the 10804 zip-code. The United States Board on Geographic Names recognizes Beechmont as the official common name for the neighborhood, which it defines as a populated place existing within the incorporated City of New Rochelle.

== History ==
While commercial New Rochelle grew and prospered in the South End along the waterfront, the expansive northern portion of town remained farmland well into the 19th century. During the Revolutionary War, British and Hessian troops, en route to fight George Washington's soldiers in the Battle of White Plains, had been encamped along North Avenue in the satellite community of Middletown. Their commander, General William Howe, charted their course from his quarters on the farm of James Pugsley, a Quaker whose property stretched from the current campus of New Rochelle High School to the Long Island Sound shore. Around the turn of the 20th century, this farmland began to give way to residential development. Well-to-do businessmen built fine homes on spacious plots conveniently located just 45 minutes from midtown Manhattan by rail. Architects designed houses of comfort and elegance in a variety of historical styles with traditional appeal. Colonial Revival and Tudor and Elizabethan were favorites, along with the Spanish Colonial Revival and Neo-Classical Revival styles.

=== Development ===
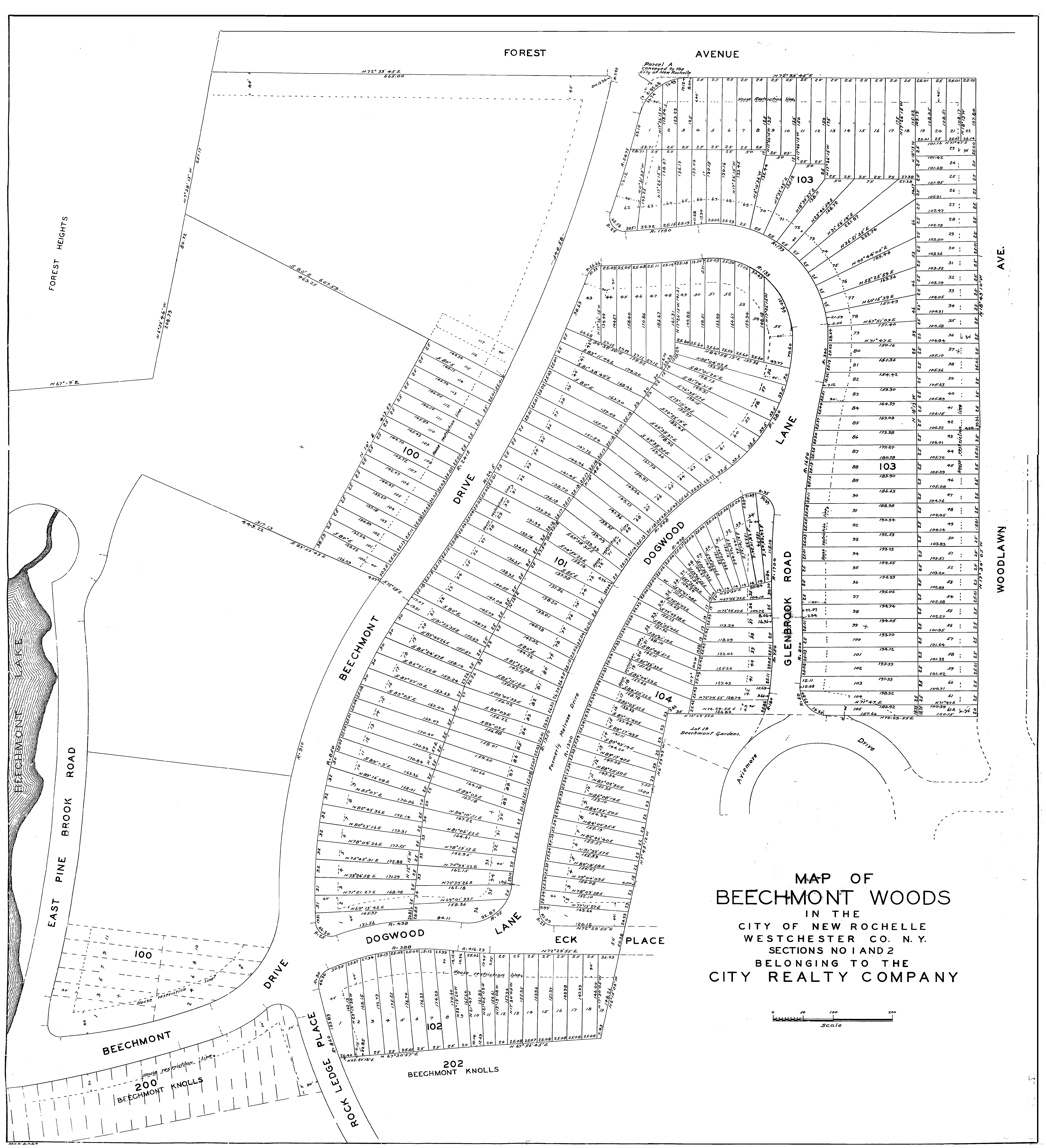

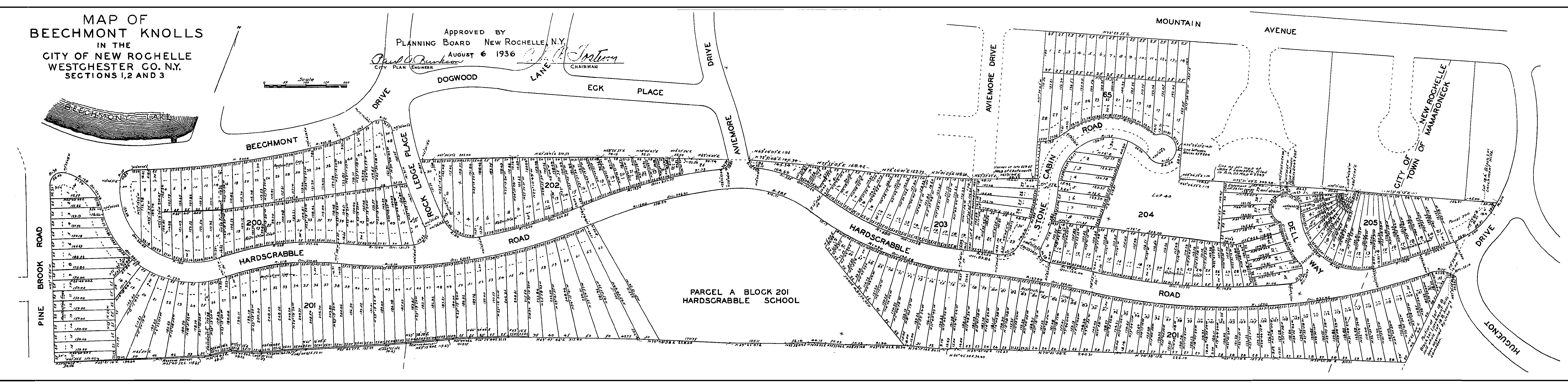

Beechmont, a high, woodland tract of several hundred acres, was planned by Eugene and John Lambden in 1902 for the City Realty Company. City Realty was a company formed by the Lambden family, local lawyers and bankers who purchased portions of the Pugsley and Montgomery farms for the creation of a residential community. By damming Pine Brook, the Company created the centerpiece of their development, Beechmont Lake. Met with an unusual public favor from the start, the area was commonly referred to as 'New Rochelle's Tuxedo'.

The original property to be developed extended from North Avenue west to Beechmont Lake. In 1910 the development was widened to include additional property south of the lake. By 1920 many of the streets were turned over by the City Realty owner, to the City of New Rochelle. Stone pillars were erected to mark the entrances to Beechmont and as the community was extended to the Larchmont border, planning was made for additional pillars to be built.

Beechmont Woods was created in 1922 with the addition of another large swath of land stretching from the Lake east to the Mamaroneck town border, with Forest Knolls and Larchmont Woods to the north. In 1936, the last segment of Beechmont called Beechmont Knolls, was developed on property along the Larchmont Village border however, was quickly incorporated into Beechmont Woods. Before long the growing number of families moving to the area prompted the construction of Barnard Elementary School in 1931. The Medieval Revival architectural style of the building was chosen to complement the Tudor style of the neighboring homes.

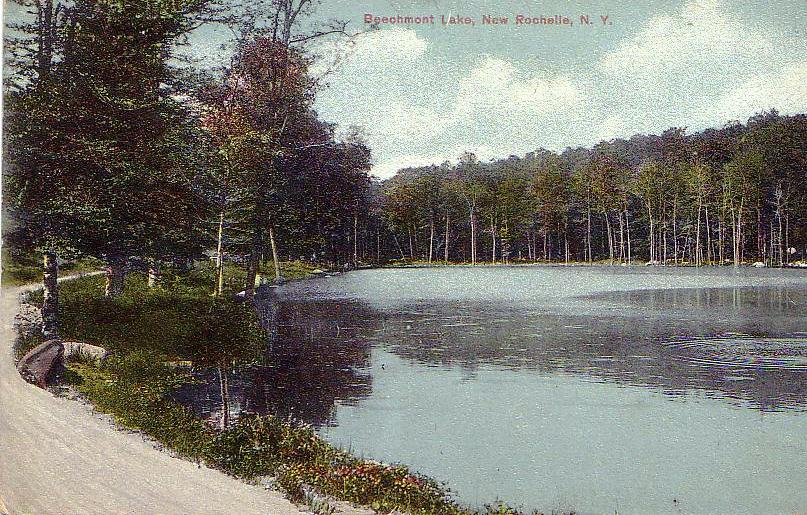

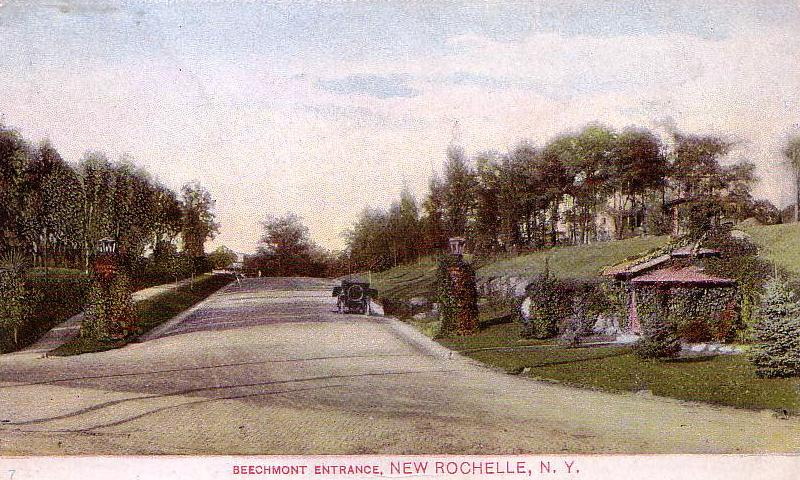

== Links ==
- Association of Beechmont, New York
- (GNIS) - Beechmont
- (GNIS) - Beechmont Woods
- NY Hometown Locator - Community Profile
