= Seacord Cemetery =

Cemetery in New Rochelle, New York, US

- Interactive map of Seacord Cemetery

Details
- Established: 1886
- Location: Wykagyl, New Rochelle, New York
- Country: United States
- Coordinates: 40°56′37.1″N 73°47′43.6″W
- Type: Catholic
- Owned by: Blessed Sacrament Church
- Find a Grave: Seacord Cemetery

Seacord Cemetery (also known as the First Methodist Episcopal Churchyard and Methodist Episcopal Cemetery) is a historic cemetery located in the Wykagyl section the city of New Rochelle in Westchester County, New York. The cemetery is located to the south of the First Methodist Episcopal Church building at 1228 North Avenue. By the year 1787 the group which formed this church had become strong enough to buy a piece of property and erect a church. The graveyard adjoining the church on the south and west dates from the purchase of the church lot. The burial plot north of the church building is a family burying ground founded by Israel Seacord, owner of the farm.

The section of the community in which this church and cemetery are located was called "Upper Rochelle" at the time and then contained a more important group of Methodists than the lower portion of town. There was no cemetery in this area until after the organization of the church in 1787. At present, there is no boundary line between the two cemeteries, so records include both. Also included here are the names from Saint John's Methodist Church, formerly located on Main where they were removed due to urban development.
