= Wykagyl Country Club =

Golf course in New Rochelle, New York, U.S.

Coordinates: 40°56′35″N 73°47′36″W

- Interactive map of Wykagyl Country Club

Club information
- Location: Wykagyl, New Rochelle, New York, USA
- Established: 1898
- Type: private
- Total holes: 18
- Tournaments: HSBC Women's World Match Play Championship
- Website: http://www.wykagylcc.org/
- Designed by: A. W. Tillinghast & Donald Ross
- Par: 72
- Length: 6,702 yards
- Course rating: 73

Wykagyl Country Club is a golf course in the Wykagyl section of New Rochelle, New York. Through the years, the club has hosted major professional and amateur tournaments and is considered to be one of the premier "classic courses" in the country.

The club is private and application for membership is by invitation only.

== History ==
=== Creation of the PGA ===
In February 1916, the Professional Golfers' Association of America was established in New York City. One month earlier, the wealthy department store owner Rodman Wanamaker hosted a luncheon at the Wykagyl Country Club in New Rochelle. This gathering of Wanamaker and the leading golf professionals of the day prepared the agenda for the formal organization of the PGA in New York City a month later. The organization's first president was Robert White, one of Wykagyl's best known golf professionals of the time. Golf historians have dubbed Wykagyl "The Cradle of the PGA".

=== Club grounds ===
The course was initially designed by Lawrence Van Etten and was completed in 1905. It quickly became famous for both its beauty and the cruelty of its hilly terrain. English golf pro Harry Vardon dubbed the 18th hole, also known as "cardiac hill," as "one of the greatest" he ever played. Over the years Wykagyl has attracted a number of prominent golf pros including George Duncan, Walter Hagen, Ben Hogan, Bobby Jones, Byron Nelson, Sam Snead, and Alex Smith.

The design of the golf course has evolved over the years, although the greens on the 1st, 7th, 9th, and 16th holes remain essentially unchanged from the original design. In the 1920s, several holes including the 5th and 6th were redesigned by Donald Ross, one of the most noted architects of the period. A. W. Tillinghast made additional changes in the 1930s, eliminating holes and improving others. In 1994, golf course architect Arthur Hills did a complete overhaul of the course to keep it in line with championship standards, such as being over 6,600 yards (6,000 m) long, with a 72 par. Most recently, Bill Coore and Ben Crenshaw completed structural renovations aimed at preserving the rugged character of the course.

In 2016, the course received a largely positive review by Golf Atlas publisher and leading golf course architecture expert, Ran Morrissett. In that review review, Bill Coore said of Wykagyl, "It's easy to make a course hard; it is a far greater challenge to make it interesting and that's what they have done at Wykagyl."

=== Significant events ===
Horace Rawlins, winner of the first U.S. Open Championship, held in 1895, later became head professional at Wykagyl. In 1944 Wykagyl hosted its first notable charity event to benefit the American Red Cross, the 1944 New York Red Cross Tournament. The tournament ranked as one of the top events of 1944, as no U.S. Opens were held from 1942 through 1945 because of World War II and no Metropolitan Opens from 1941 through 1948. The 1949 Goodall Palm Beach Round Robin at Wykagyl was the first golf tournament to be broadcast by a television network. In 1977 the club hosted its first professional event, the LPGA Talk Tournament. Beginning in 1990, the JAL Big Apple Classic became a regular annual event at the club. Although the sponsors and names of the tournament changed over time, the venue remained constant for the next 17 years. In 2007 Wykagyl was the site of the HSBC Women's World Match Play Championship.

== Course detail ==
Lawrence Van Etten, a Wykagyl member, laid out the original golf course when the club moved to New Rochelle in 1905. Over the years nine other golf architects have worked on the course, some very briefly, others more extensively: Walter Travis (1908), Donald Ross (1919), Tom Winton (1920), Roben White (1921–27), A. W. Tillinghast (1930), Trent Jones (1960), Hal Purdy (1963–70), Stephen Kay (1990), and Arthur Hills (1994). The most significant changes to the course occurred during the redesigns by Ross and Tillinghast.

The Wykagyl course is hilly, tree-lined and accented by its stone tees. It is old fashioned, primarily because the three architects who were mainly responsible for the layout of the course - Lawrence Van Enen, Donald Ross and A. W. Tillinghast - all practiced their art over 60 years ago. Because of this it has small greens and more blind shots than any architect could get away with designing today.

The tee shots on Holes 1, 3, 8, 15 and 17 are blind, and there are several blind approach shots on Holes 2, 6 and 14. The second and third shots at Hole 9 are blind, depending on length. There also are several holes that are semi-blind; the surface of the green cannot be seen when playing approach shots on Holes 5, 10, 18, and on 15 (for the long hitter). These blind shots are only blind once. Still, they do make Wykagyl difficult to play for a golfer who has never seen it before. Wykagyl is unique in its mix of par threes, par fours and par fives. Most 18-hole courses have four par threes, four par fives and ten par fours, but Wykagyl has five par fives, five par threes and eight par fours.

Hole	Yards	Par (M / W)	Handicap (M / W)
1	493	5 / 5	11 / 7
2	160	4 / 4	7 / 13
3	482	4 / 4	1 / 3
4	197	3 / 3	17 / 17
5	406	4 / 4	3 / 1
6	367	5 / 5	9 / 5
7	222	3 / 3	15 / 15
8	365	4 / 4	5 / 11
9	366	5 / 5	13 / 9
10	401	5 / 5	2 / 4
11	375	3 / 3	18 / 18
12	398	5 / 5	6 / 2
13	139	3 / 3	16 / 12
14	379	4 / 4	14 / 14
15	432	4 / 4	12 / 10
16	164	3 / 4	14 / 16
17	396	4 / 4	8 / 6
18	481	4/ 4	10 / 8

== Major tournaments at Wykagyl ==
The years 1908 through 1916 were very active for golf at Wykagyl. The Club hosted not only its own Invitational event but also the 1909 Metropolitan Open, won by Alex Smith. Smith also captained an American team that competed in the British Open and then played a match against France.

Wykagyl hosted a number of exhibition matches featuring both international and domestic golfers. Participants included British professionals George Duncan and Harry Vardon, as well as American amateurs Jerome Travers and Chick Evans and professionals Walter Hagen and Gil Nicholls. Club professionals Val Bermingham and Alex Smith also competed in many of these events.

Wykagyl was in the forefront of establishing the Westchester County Golf Association and hosted the first two Westchester County Amateur Championships.

Year	Tournament	Winner	Score	Notes
1909	Metropolitan Open	Gilbert Nicholls		
1908	Wykagyl Invitational	W.K.Gillette		
1909	Wykagyl Invitational	Val Bermingham		
1910	Wykagyl Invitational	Gardiner White		
1911	Wykagyl Invitational	E.M. Wild		Invitational discontinued
1915	Westchester Amateur	John G. Anderson		
1916	Westchester Amateur	R.F. Mundy		
1922	Spalding Pro Event	Bobby Cruickshank		
1925	Westchester Amateur	John G. Anderson		
1927	Metropolitan Open	Johnny Farrell		
1934	Metropolitan Amateur	T.S. Tailer, Jr.		
1944	New York Red Cross Tourney	Byron Nelson		
1948	Goodall Palm Beach Round Robin	Herman Barron	+38	
1949	Goodall Palm Beach Round Robin	Bobby Locke	+66	First telecast of a golf event by NBC
1950	Goodall Palm Beach Round Robin	Lloyd Mangrum	+37	
1951	Goodall Palm Beach Round Robin	Roberto De Vicenzo	+40	
1952	Goodall Palm Beach Round Robin	Sam Snead	+57	
1956	Goodall Palm Beach Round Robin	Gene Littler	+55	
1957	Goodall Palm Beach Round Robin	Sam Snead	+41	
1961	Triangle Round Robin	Mary Lena Faulk	+35	
1964	Wykagyl Round Robin	Miller Barber		
1965	Ike Championship	Jerry Courville, Sr.		
1966	Ike Championship	James E. Fisher		
1967	Ike Championship	Jerry Courville, Sr.		
1968	Ike Championship	Denny Lyons		
1976	Girl Talk Classic	Pat Bradley	217 (+1)	
1976	Ike Championship	Bob Housen		
1977	Talk Tournament '77	JoAnne Carner	284 (−4)	
1978	Golden Lights Championship	Nancy Lopez	277 (−11)	
1979	Golden Lights Championship	Nancy Lopez	280 (−8)	
1980	Golden Lights Championship	Beth Daniel	287 (−1)	
1982	Chrysler-Plymouth Charity Classic	Cathy Morse	216 (E)	
1984	MasterCard International Pro-Am	Sally Quinlan	284 (−4)	
1990	JAL Big Apple Classic	Betsy King	273 (−15)	
1991	JAL Big Apple Classic	Betsy King	279 (−5)	
1992	JAL Big Apple Classic	Juli Inkster	273 (−11)	
1993	JAL Big Apple Classic	Hiromi Kobayashi	278 (−6)	
1994	JAL Big Apple Classic	Beth Daniel	276 (−8)	
1995	JAL Big Apple Classic	Tracy Kerdyk	273 (−11)	
1996	JAL Big Apple Classic	Caroline Pierce	211 (−2)	
1997	JAL Big Apple Classic	Michele Redman	272 (−12)	
1998	JAL Big Apple Classic	Annika Sörenstam	279 (−9)	
1998	Ike Championship	Greg Rohlf		
1999	JAL Big Apple Classic	Sherri Steinhauer	265 (−19)	
2000	JAL Big Apple Classic	Annika Sörenstam	206 (17)	
2001	Sybase Big Apple Classic	Rosie Jones	272 (−12)	
2002	Sybase Big Apple Classic	Gloria Park	270 (−14)	
2003	Sybase Big Apple Classic	Hee-Won Han	273 (−11)	
2004	Sybase Big Apple Classic	Sherri Steinhauer	272 (−12)	
2005	Sybase Big Apple Classic	Paula Creamer	278 (−6)	2nd youngest winner in tour history
2006	Sybase Big Apple Classic	Lorena Ochoa	208 (−5)	
2007	HSBC Women's World Match Play Championship	Seon Hwa Lee	2 & 1	
2007	MET Amateur	Greg Rohlf		
2013	Ike Championship	Cameron Wilson		
2018	Metropolitan Open	Andrew Svoboda	205 (−11)	

== Works cited ==
- Tollhurst, Desmond; Barban, John (1998). Wykagyl, 1898–1998. Wykagyl Country Club.
- Janke, Ken (2007). Firsts, facts, feats, & failures in the world of golf. Hoboken, N.J.: J. Wiley & Sons. ISBN 9780471965596.
