= Goodall Palm Beach Round Robin =

PGA Tour golf tournament

The Goodall Palm Beach Robin Robin was a golf tournament on the PGA Tour from 1938 to 1957. It was also known as the Goodall Robin Robin and the Palm Beach Robin Robin. The sponsors were the Goodall Company (later Goodall-Sanford Co.) and its subsidiary, the Palm Beach Clothing Co. The purse for the tournament was $5,000, with $1,000 going to the winner, from 1938 to 1941, increased to $10,000/$2,000 in 1946, and increased again to $15,000/$3,000 in 1949. Sam Snead won the event five times including both the first and last events.

== Format ==
The tournament featured an unusual round robin format. From 1938 to 1946, the field consisted of 15 players. They would play seven rounds in five threesomes, a total of 126 holes. A player earned or lost points on each hole, in a match play style, based on his score versus his two opponents for that round. A player scored "+1" for each hole won and "−1" for each hole lost to each opponent. The groups were shuffled after every round so that every player played one round against every other player. The player with the most points after seven rounds won.

In 1947, the tournament's format was altered to feature 16 invitees playing five rounds in groups of four for a total of 90 holes. In 1949, two further changes were made to the format. Up to that time, the committee, after every round, had to calculate the points won or lost on each hole for each match. This had proven difficult to figure out quickly, prompting the switch to a medal match play style where players plus or minus points were based on their medal score (strokes per round).

The cause of the second change was television. In 1949, NBC televised a segment of the event making it the first-ever network telecast of a golf tournament. To accommodate the TV coverage, Wykagyl rearranged the golf course so that the regular ninth hole became the eighteenth hole. The number of spectators at the tournament opening day topped 5,000 people, the largest attendance for any of the Round Robins to that date.

== The end of the tournament ==
After the 1957 event, the Palm Beach Round Robin dropped off the PGA Tour schedule. The majority of the touring pros, those whom no one would include in any select list of 16 players, protested the fairness of an event that forced them to take a week off in the middle of the season while the favored stars enjoyed a good payday.

== Tournament hosts ==
The tournament was played in May or June at a number of different courses, mostly in the New York metropolitan area.

Years	Country Club	Location
1938	Kenwood Country Club	Cincinnati, Ohio
1939–1941	Fresh Meadow Country Club	Great Neck, New York
1946	Winged Foot Golf Club	Mamaroneck, New York
1947	Charles River Country Club	Newton, Massachusetts
1948–1952	Wykagyl Country Club	New Rochelle, New York
1953–1954	Meadow Brook Country Club	Westbury, New York
1955	Deepdale Country Club	Great Neck, New York
1956–1957	Wykagyl Country Club	New Rochelle, New York

== Winners ==
Year	Player	Country	Score	Margin of victory	Runner(s)-up	Winner's share ($)	Ref
1957	Sam Snead	United States	+41	8	(United States) Doug Ford	3,000	
1956	Gene Littler	United States	+55	24	(United States) Ted Kroll	3,000	
1955	Sam Snead	United States	+46	24	(United States) Johnny Palmer	3,000	
1954	Sam Snead	United States	+62	36	(United States) Bob Toski	3,000	
1953	Cary Middlecoff	United States	+42	7	(United States) Jimmy Demaret	3,000	
1952	Sam Snead	United States	+57	2	(United States) Cary Middlecoff	3,000	
1951	Roberto De Vicenzo	Argentina	+40	12	(United States) Jim Ferrier	3,000	
1950	Lloyd Mangrum	United States	+37	17	(United States) Lawson Little	3,000	
1949	Bobby Locke	South Africa	+66	33	(United States) Herman Barron	3,000	
1948	Herman Barron	United States	+38	6	(South Africa) Bobby Locke	2,000	
1947	Bobby Locke	South Africa	+37	4	(United States) Vic Ghezzi	2,000	
1946	Ben Hogan	United States	+51	25	(United States) Lloyd Mangrum	2,000	
1942–1945: No tournament due to World War II
1941	Paul Runyan	United States	+26	10	(United States) Vic Ghezzi (United States) Gene Sarazen	1,000	
1940	Ben Hogan	United States	+23	4	(United States) Sam Snead	1,000	
1939	Harry Cooper	United States	+31	2	(United States) Craig Wood	1,000	
1938	Sam Snead	United States	+14	Playoff	(United States) Gene Sarazen	1,000	
