= New York Red Cross Tournament =

Golf tournament

The New York Red Cross Tournament was an American golf tournament. The event was won by legendary golfer Byron Nelson and earned PGA Tour-level status.

== History ==
The tournament was hosted by Wykagyl Country Club in New Rochelle, New York. The event was played from June 15 − 18, 1944. Byron Nelson won with a score of 275, four ahead of Vic Ghezzi. Nelson was tied for the lead after two rounds and then scored a third round 66 (−6) to give him a five-stroke lead over Ghezzi. Nelson had a final round 71 against Ghezzi's 70 and defeated him by four strokes. Mike Turnesa was third, nine shots behind Nelson.

== Winners ==
Year	Player	Score	To par	Margin of victory	Runner-up	Winner's share ($)	Ref
1944	(United States) Byron Nelson	275	−13	4 strokes	(United States) Vic Ghezzi	2,666	
