= Henry Barnard Early Childhood Center =

Henry Barnard School

Location
- 129 Barnard Road; New Rochelle, New York 10801; United States
- Coordinates: 40°55′58.33″N 73°46′23.6″W

Information
- Type: Elementary school
- NCES School ID: 362049001896
- Principal: Dr. Nicolas Cracco
- Assistant Principal: Candice Lee
- Website: barnard.nred.org

Henry Barnard Early Childhood Center is an early education school comprising grades Pre-K through 2nd grade, and part of the City School District of New Rochelle, located in the Beechmont section of New Rochelle in Westchester County, New York. Within the school are several district programs including a four-year pre-k through grade 2 magnet program and the district's Pre-School Speech Language Learning Center. Barnard's Early Childhood Center (EC^{2}) has been recognized as a Sharing Success Program by the State of New York.

EC2, a primary magnet program, offers a four-year sequence for youngsters from pre-kindergarten to second grade. It provides a project-based approach to learning adapted from the internationally recognized Reggio Emilia method of instruction with a strong emphasis on language development.

== Overview ==
=== Information ===
- Year-round schedule: No
- Magnet school: Yes
- Coeducational: Yes
- Teachers: 33
- Students: 622
- Student/teacher ratio: 14.56

=== Demographics ===
The student body in the school year of 2005-2006 consists of:

- 41% Caucasian
- 36% African American
- 18% Hispanic
- 5% Asian American/Pacific Islander
