= Wykagyl, New Rochelle, New York =

Wykagyl
- Populated place
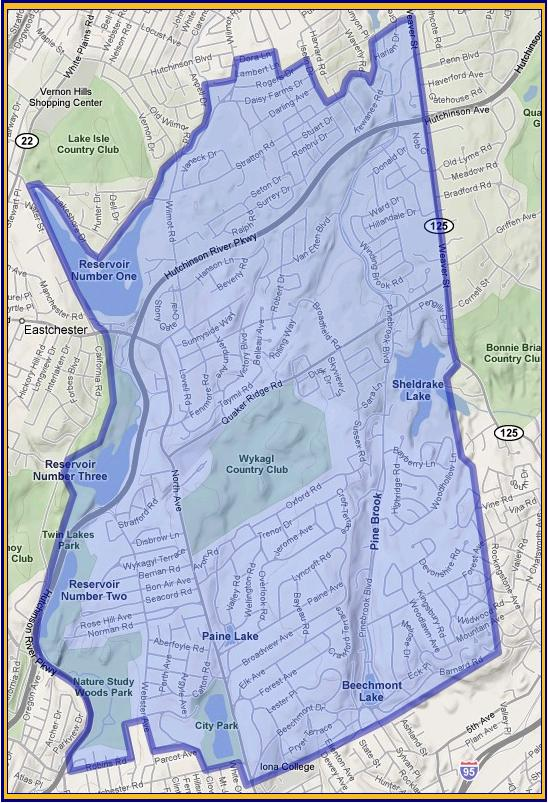
- Coordinates: 40°56′29″N 73°47′58″W
- Country: United States
- State: New York
- County: Westchester

Government
  - Type: Council-Manager
  - Mayor: Yadira Ramos-Herbert

Area
  - Total: 6 sq mi (16 km^{2})
  - Land: 5 sq mi (13 km^{2})
  - Water: 1 sq mi (2.6 km^{2})
- Elevation: 120 ft (37 m)

Population (2010)
  - Total: 14,146
  - Density: 2,800/sq mi (1,100/km^{2})
- Time zone: UTC-5 (Eastern (EST))
  - Summer (DST): UTC-4 (EDT)
- ZIP code: 10804
- Area code: 914
- FIPS code: 83327
- GNIS feature ID: 971774

Wykagyl is a suburban community in New Rochelle, Westchester County, New York, United States. It is conterminous with ZIP code 10804, encompassing much of the city's 'North End'. According to Forbes, in 2010 Wykagyl's 10804 ZIP code, with a median home price of $806,264, ranked 333rd on its list of the 500 most expensive ZIP codes in the U.S. The Washington Post ranks Wykagyl among the nation's 650 Super Zips, or those with the highest percentile rankings for median household income and the share of adults with college degrees or higher.

== Overview ==
Wykagyl consists primarily of sprawling, residential parks and planned communities built in the early to mid-20th century, featuring large period-style homes and well-landscaped lots. Architectural styles include Elizabethan and Cotswold Tudors, Mediterranean-style villas, and classic colonials. Colonial, ranch and split-level homes typical of the 1950s and 60's dominate the northernmost end of the community. At the center of the community is an 18-hole golf course and country club and a small business district of retail stores and offices, garden apartment complexes and condominium developments, public and private educational institutions, and assorted houses of worship.

The area's unusual name (pronounced WIKE'-uh-gihl or WICK-uh-gill) is commonly believed to have originated through the combination of two Native American words: wigwos, meaning birch bark, and keag, meaning country. The name most likely resulted from the shortening the name of an Algonquian-speaking band of Lenape who originally inhabited the area.

== History ==
Around the end of the 19th century, this area of "Upper Rochelle" was still primarily farmland with the exception of the Wykagyl Country Club, which moved to its current site in 1905. By 1912, New Rochelle's home development was rapidly extending northward, with North Avenue serving as the central thoroughfare. A syndicate of bankers and investors began amassing expansive tracts of forest and farmland surrounding the club, eventually incorporating under the name Wykagyl Reservation. The reservation was ideally located to take advantage of the new transportation facilities afforded by the recently completed New York, Westchester and Boston Railway commuter line through the area. Alfred Feltheimer, the architect who designed and named the railroad's stations, chose "Wykagyl" after the golf club. The new rail line spurred new construction and commercial activity, prompting a population boom.

Developers immediately began building and selling houses on the waiting large tracts of farmland. "Wykagyl Gardens", one of the largest apartment complexes in the country at the time, was built next to the station.

development map

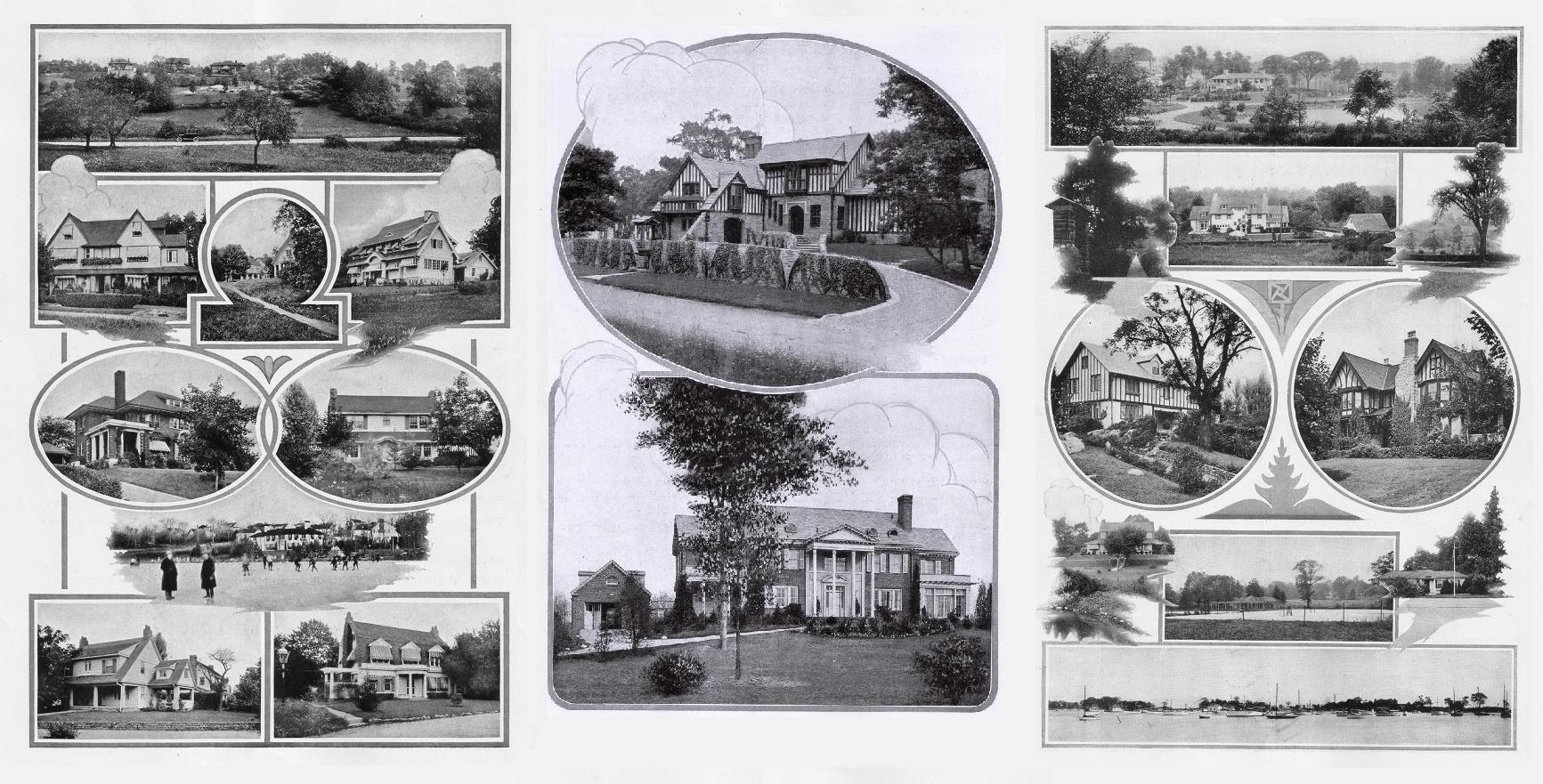
homes in Wykagyl Park

== Demographics ==
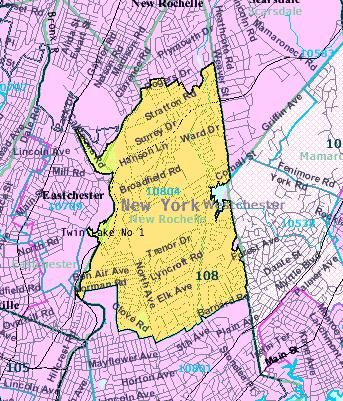
Census map of Wykagyl

As of the census of 2010, there were 14,146 people, 4,961 households, and 3,957 families residing in the Wykagyl ZIP code area. There were 5,183 housing units, 94.8% of which were owner occupied. The racial makeup of Wykagyl was 85.2% White, 7.9% Black or African American, 0.06% Native American, 4.1% Asian, and 2% from two or more races. Hispanic or Latino of any race were 3% of the population.

There were 4,961 households, out of which 1,808 had children under the age of 18 living with them. 3,689 were married couples living together, 224 had a female householder with no husband present, and 828 were non-families. 490 households constituted someone living alone who was 65 years of age or older. The average family size was 3.3 people.

In the Wykagyl ZIP code area, the population was spread out, with 27% under the age of 18, 11% from 18 to 24, 11% from 18 to 34, 44% from 35 to 64, and 17% who were 65 years of age or older. 4,104 residents of Wykagyl were enrolled in school, with 16% (658) in pre-school or kindergarten, 1,857 (40%) in elementary school, 909 (22%) in high school, and 680 (17%) in college or graduate school. 85% of the population completed "college" or higher, with 42% attaining a "graduate degree" or higher.

About 2% of the population was below the poverty line, including 2% of those under age 18 and 1% of those age 65 or over. The total civilian labor force was 7,001 residents, out of which 6,884 (97.8%) were employed. The median income for a household in Wykagyl was $165,154, and the median income for a family was $199,061. 3,001 households (62%) earned $100,000 or more, with 1,970 (41%) earning in excess of $150,000 annually.

== Education ==
=== Public ===
The area is served by the City School District of New Rochelle, which operates a public high school, two junior high schools, and six elementary schools. Located within Wykagyl are:

- Albert Leonard Middle School - grades 6 through 8
- Henry Barnard Early Childhood Center
- New Rochelle High School
- William B. Ward Elementary School - pre-kindergarten through grade 5

=== Private ===
Several private primary and secondary schools are located within the Wykagyl area, including:

- Iona Grammar School - grades 1 through 8
- Iona Prep - grades 9 through 12
- The Ursuline School - grades 6 through 12
- Thornton-Donovan School - kindergarten through grade 12
- Hudson Country Montessori School - pre-kindergarten through grade 2

== Points of interest ==
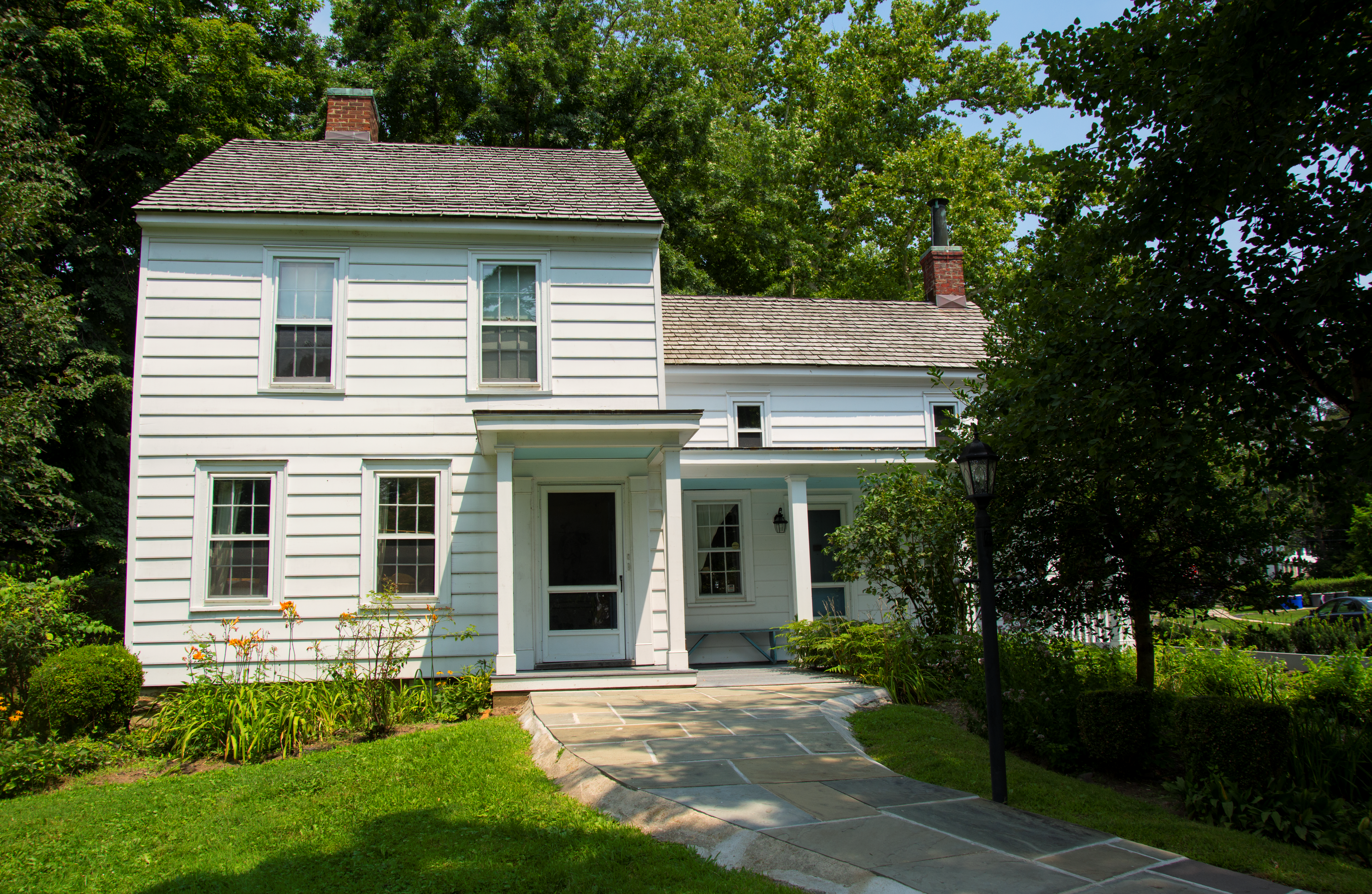
Thomas Paine Cottage

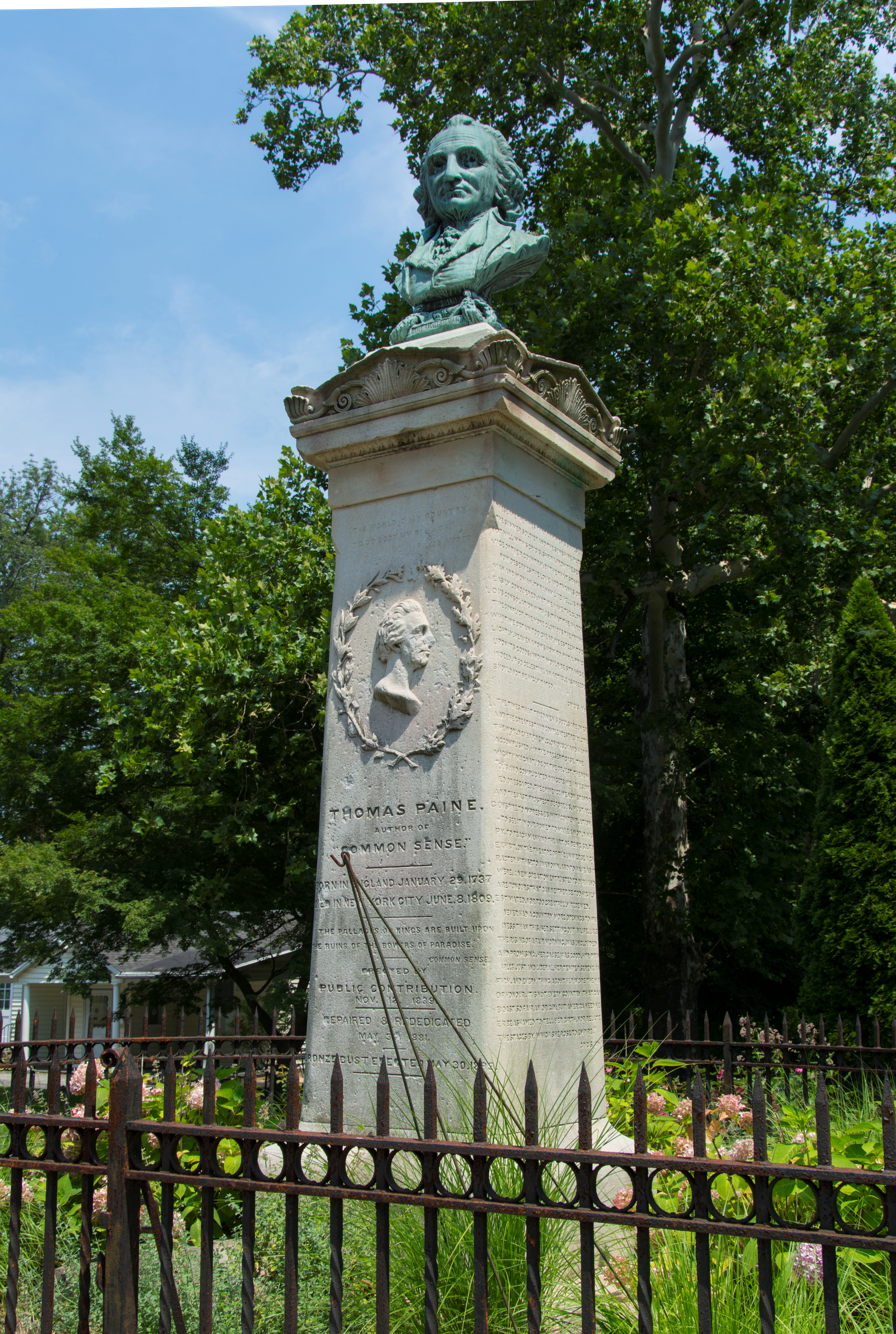
The Thomas Paine Monument

=== Historic sites ===
- Several sites in Wykagyl commemorate the life of Thomas Paine, American pamphleteer and Revolutionary War hero, including his home, his burial site, and a museum. Paine's home, the Thomas Paine Cottage, was built in 1793 after a fire destroyed the previous home. The cottage was moved to its current location, which is on land that was part of the 300-acre (1.2 km^{2}) farm owned by Paine. The house, which is a National Historic Landmark, is currently operated as a museum. The Thomas Paine Memorial Museum building, which houses the library and museum collection of the Thomas Paine National Historical Association, was built in 1925.
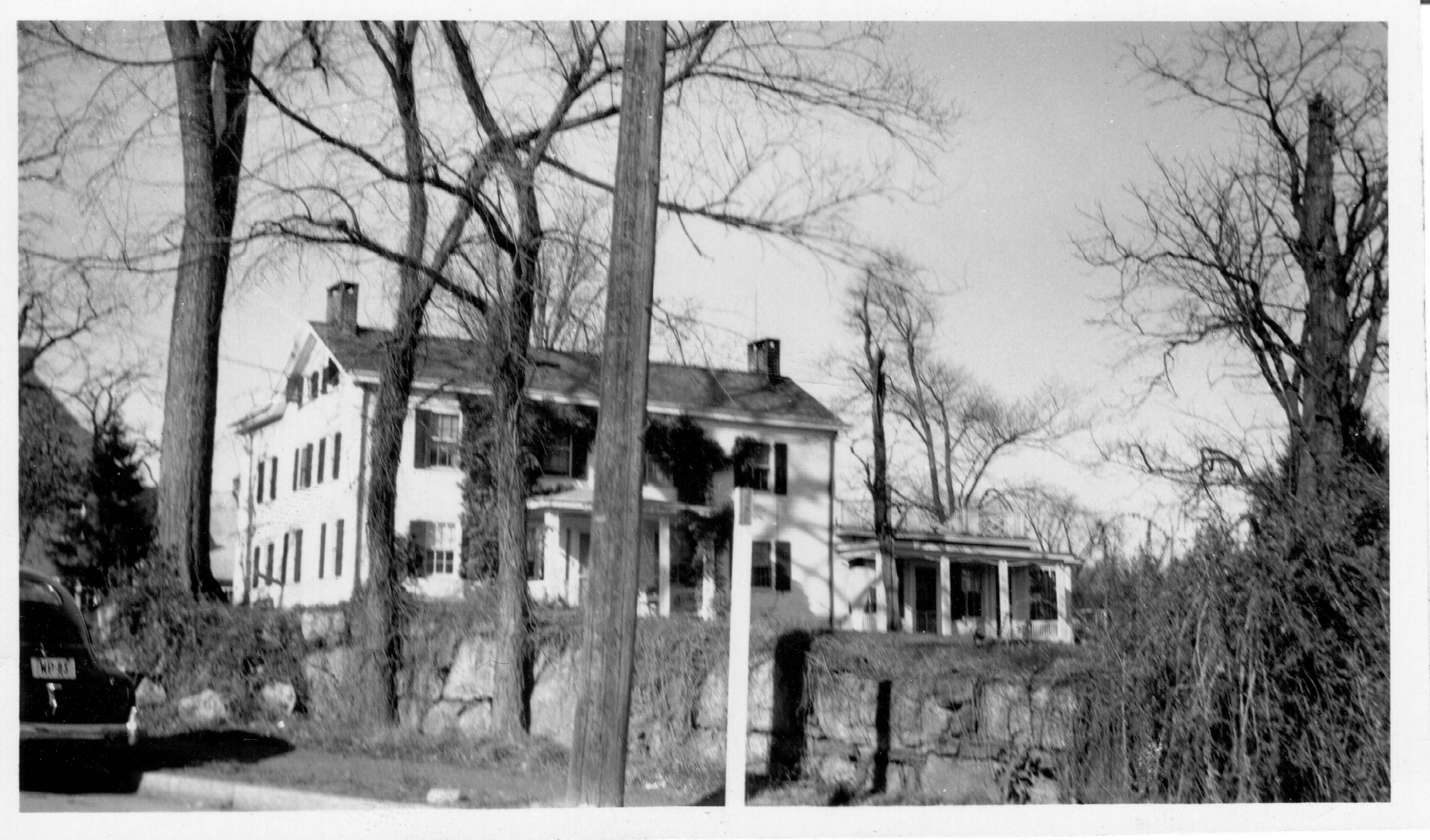
- Israel Secord House, 1946 photo. (Sheehy family collection)
  Israel Secord House, 1337 North Avenue at Quaker Ridge Road: The original section of the house on this site is believed to have been constructed in the 1770s by Israel Secord, on land deeded to him by his father, James. During the Revolutionary War, Sir Lord William Howe, commander of British forces, made his headquarters in the Secord farmhouse before marching his troops to the Battle of White Plains, October 1776. In the rear of the home stood the “hanging tree”, an oak tree from the 1700s reportedly used to execute prisoners during the Revolutionary War. It was struck by lightning in the 1950s and subsequently cut down, though pieces of the tree were kept by area residents. Although the Israel Secord farmhouse was enlarged and remodeled over the years, it still retains many of its historical elements. The farm’s cider mill is now the home at 22 Quaker Ridge Road. Records show that the land remained in the Secord family until the turn of the 20th century, when it was purchased by Charles and Regina Niehaus. Charles was a nationally recognized sculptor who created many notable sculptures in Washington; Regina became a renowned horticulturist. The farmland was sold off, bit by bit, to the developers of Bonnie Crest neighborhood. From about 1946 to 1970, the Israel Secord House was home to Daniel F. Sheehy, a packaging executive and prominent Roman Catholic layman, his wife Ruth and their six children. During that time, the interior of the home was decorated with early American and Victorian furnishings and Colonial-style reproductions. During that time, more of the land was lost, especially frontage on North Avenue and Quaker Ridge Road taken by the city for road improvements. The family received several offers to sell the property for commercial development, and at one point, the City of New Rochelle considered constructing their new library on the site. The home received a 2008 New Rochelle Heritage Award.
- The Brewster Schoolhouse: one of the oldest structural relics in Westchester County, dates to the 18th century, and is 15 feet (4.6 m) by 20 feet (6.1 m).
- Norman Rockwell's studio: home and studio where the artist created much of his iconic Saturday Evening Post work.
- St. John's Wilmot Church: a historic Episcopal parish in the northern end of the City at the intersection of North Avenue and Wilmot Road, formerly referred to as "Cooper's Corner."

=== Parks and recreation ===
- Wykagyl Country Club - a private facility that has hosted Ladies Professional Golf Association tournaments.
- Ward Acres - a combination of untouched forest, wild lawns and meadows, acres of hiking and exercise trails, and historic horse stables and cemeteries. It encompasses 62 acres (250,000 m^{2}), with the forests divided into four main sections (North Woods, Northwest Woods, Central Woods, and Southeast Woods), each distinct in both general characteristics and species presence.
- Leatherstocking Trail - a 2 miles (3.2 km) long, inter-municipal hiking trail situated between New Rochelle and Mamaroneck, eventually linking into Saxon Woods County Park. It is part of a larger Colonial Greenway Trail in which it connects to Twin Lakes/Nature Study and Saxon Woods parks.
- Sheldrake Lake, a former reservoir that is now a 60-acre (240,000 m^{2}) park and nature conservancy promoting an increased understanding of the local ecology.
- Twin Lakes Park and Nature Study Woods - together these sites comprise 220 acres (0.89 km^{2}) of woods, marsh, lakes, ponds, and some fields along the Hutchinson River. There are many foot trails weaving through woods, marshlands, and fields and around two large lakes.
- Lake Isle - a man-made reservoir located in the north-western section of Wykagyl along the Eastchester border. The lake is currently used for recreational purposes and is the only inland body of water in lower Westchester County that is used for swimming and boating. Large mouth bass, perch, catfish, eel, sunfish, and shiners are some of the fish that are indigenous to the lake. When the Hutchinson River Parkway was reconstructed around 1988, a horse trail with two new bridges was built between the parkway and the dam allowing equestrians to ride their horses along the edge of the lake.

== In film ==
Scenes in Goodfellas were filmed on Alfred Lane, off Quaker Ridge Road and down the street from Albert Leonard Middle School. The house of the parents of Henry Hill's eventual wife, Karen, is on Alfred Lane. Henry goes across the street and pistol whips the neighbor after the neighbor sexually attacks Karen. The scene where Karen is on a pay phone calling Henry and crying about her next-door neighbor bothering her was filmed in the parking lot next to Wykagyl Country Club.

The movie Catch Me If You Can, based on the life of Frank Abagnale Jr., is set in New Rochelle in the 1960s. In the film, the Abagnale family resides in Wykagyl and Frank Abagnale Senior is inducted as the 58th life member of the New Rochelle Rotary Club.

== Other information ==
- U.S. Geological Survey Geographic Names Information System: Wykagyl Station New Rochelle Post Office
- 40.947321°N 73.794855°W
