= John G. Anderson =

American seismologist

John G. Anderson (born 1948) is an American seismologist and Professor at the University of Nevada, Reno. Anderson specializes in studies of strong ground motion and seismic hazards. He was Director of the Nevada Seismological Laboratory from 1998 to 2009. He has published more than 150 articles and more than 90 abstracts. He completed a PhD in Geophysics from Columbia University in 1976 and a Bachelor of Science in physics from Michigan State University in 1970. He received his high school diploma in 1966.
