= Ward Acres Nature Preserve =

Park in New Rochelle, New York, U.S.

Coordinates: 40.958°N 73.781°W

Ward Acres is a 62-acre park in the Wykagyl section of the city of New Rochelle, in Westchester County, New York. Formerly part of a large country estate and horse farm, New Rochelle purchased the land in 1962 with help from the New York State Park and Recreation Land Acquisition Bond Act.

Ward Acres provides residents with a unique park experience within a natural setting. Wooded areas are much the same as they had been over a century ago, and current park trails follow the alignment of the early horse farm's trails and drives. Stone walls which once defined pastures, the grave sites of Ward champion horses and three of the farm's main buildings still stand on the property.

== Park features ==
The major components of the park include:

- Barn complex – (15,000 sq. ft.) Built in 1906 for the Dickerman family, the barn is a good example of the Shingle Style revival of a domestic architectural style made popular for estate buildings by the New York architects McKim, Mead, and White at the turn of the 20th century. However, As of May 2024, due to unsafe and hazardous conditions, the City of New Rochelle had made plans to demolish the century old barn complex. The demolition is also a part of the Ward Acres Park improvement project for more green space, and added park features for residents.
- Farm house – (2,500 sq. ft.) The house is a two-story cross-gabled structure located in the northeast section of Ward Acres.
- ‘Forge’ outbuilding – (1,000 sq. ft.) The buildings origin is uncertain, with some believing it was constructed as an iron forge for the construction of the NYW&B railway while others believe it served the metallurgical needs of the Ward racing horse farm.
- Trails - (9,000 linear feet) Most of the trail system throughout Ward Acres is a carry over from the days as a horse farm. An informal perimeter trail runs around the Park, and there are a number of secondary trails that cross it. The trail system is not formalized and, as a result, trails are not clearly defined throughout.
- Stone walls – (7,500 linear feet) The walls separate approximately 27 acres behind the barn, into a series of open meadows.
- Meadow Areas – (27 acres) These areas date from the park's time as a horse farm. They are located in the southern and central part of the property.
- Woodland area – (35 acres) The woodlands include a diversity of species including Cherry, Beech, Oak, Ash, Tulip Tree and Maple. The northern, least visited section of the park, is host to a number of mature specimens.

== Property history ==
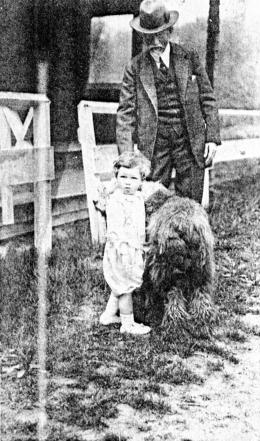
Watson Dickerson, original owner of estate

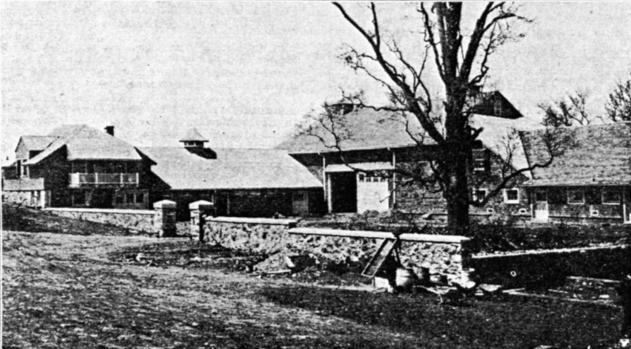
Horse stables

=== Hillandale Farm ===
Ward Acres was originally part of the estate of Watson Dickerman. Born in 1846 in Mount Carmel, Connecticut, Dickerman bought property on Quaker Ridge Road in 1884 for breeding 'American Trotters'; he named the estate "Hillandale Farm". Over the years he added to his estate until it reached nearly 500 acres in Mamaroneck and New Rochelle. Dickerman was a partner in the financial firm of Dominick and Dickerman, the president of the New York Stock Exchange in the 1890s, and served as the president of the New York Zoological Society.

His son Watson P. Dickerman became well known in horse breeding circles for his elaborate stables and for his two great sires; "Bellini" and "Atlantic Express". The tombstones for some of Dickerman's famous standardbreds including: "Ethelbertha", Grand Dam of Bellini (1881); "Merry Clay", Dam of Bellini (1881) and "Bellini" (1887) are visible along one of the trails within the park.

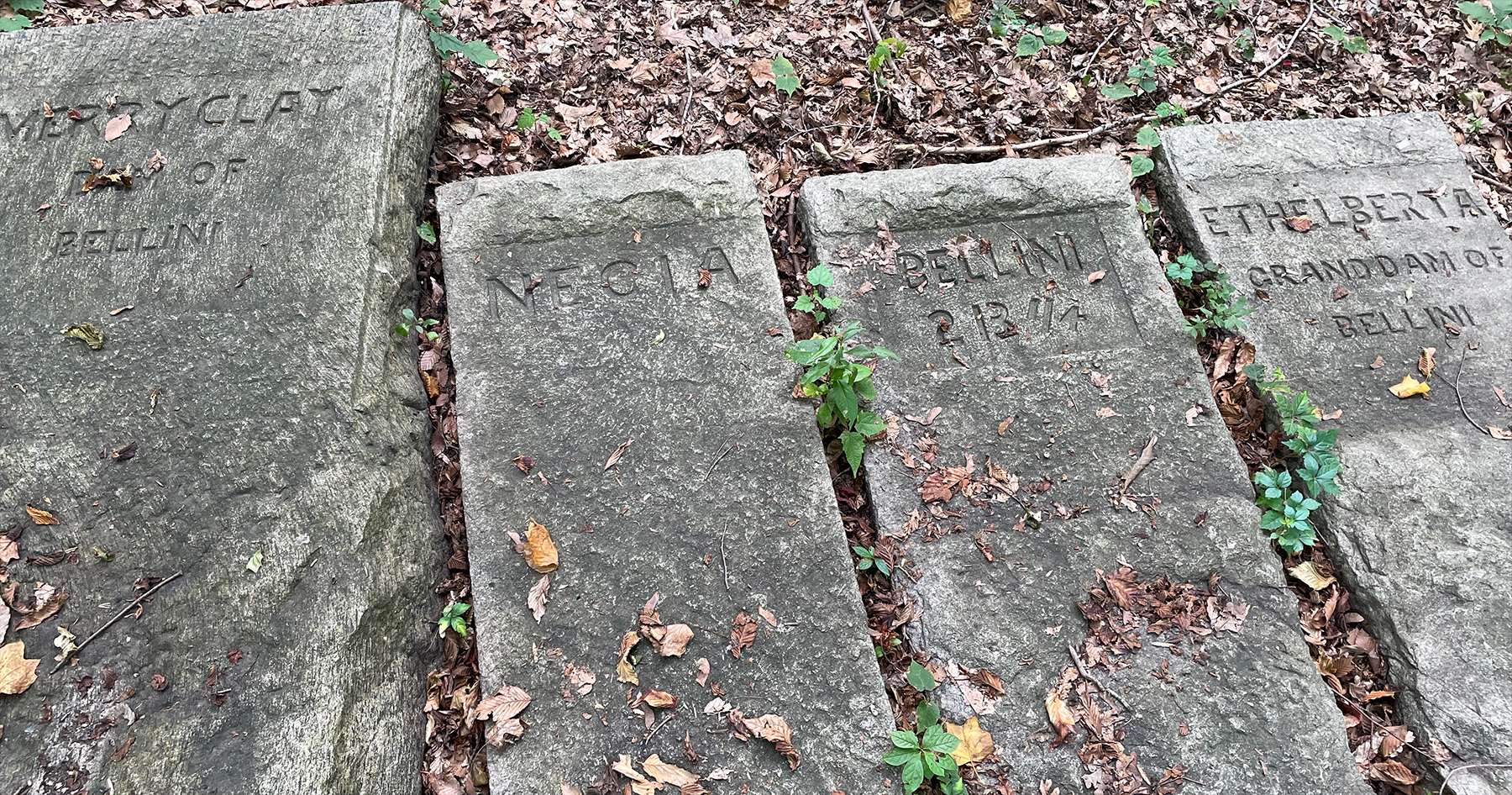
Tombstones of Merry Clay, Necia, Bellini, and Ethelberta

Dickerman died in 1923 leaving the bulk of his $5,000,000 estate to his wife who then sold a large portion of the land to the Ward family in 1925.

=== Homewood Estate ===
Robert B. Ward was born in 1852 in New York City where his parents owned a small bakery. The family moved to Pittsburgh, PA in 1856 and continued to work in the bakery business. At the age of 21 he joined forces with his brother George to open a bakery of their own. The Ward Bread Company expanded to include factories across the middle and northeastern United States. After amassing a substantial fortune, Ward moved his family to New Rochelle in 1912 and built a large residence and associated buildings on quaker ridge road. The main house, which no longer stands, was known as ‘Homewood’ and was located on the south side of the road across from what is today the Hudson Montessori School. The main building of the current school was the original stables and garage of the Ward estate. Robert Ward died suddenly in 1915 leaving his $15,000,000 estate to his wife and their nine children.

One of Robert's sons, William B. Ward, born in 1884, moved on to become the president of the Ward Baking Corporation after his father's death. William and his wife purchased a large portion of the Dickerman ‘Hillandale Farm’ estate from Florence Dickerman in 1925. This purchase includes what is today known as Ward Acres.

Between 1945 and 1953 the stables and barns on the estate were renovated by William's son Jack B. Ward who took a great interest in the property and founded the "American Saddle Horse Breeding Company". Jack's endeavors were rather successful, with his horses winning hundreds of ribbons. His horse "Hickory Mistress" alone won 21 ribbons in 1847. The enterprise continued until 1957.

In 1949 Jack proposed a plan for a 1,000-seat theater, a museum, and a restaurant on the property adjacent to the barn structure. The theater was to bring projected Broadway productions to New Rochelle for two week tryout periods. The plan was voted down by the City Council in 1949. In 1956, Ward did start a motion picture company at 435 North Avenue known as Ward Acres Studios. He advertised modern, air-conditioned studios and sound stages at the North Avenue address, but also offered 100 acres of his Westchester estate for private location shooting.

Jack and his mother Ethel sold off much of their estate for housing development in the 1950s. Ethel Ward donated to New Rochelle the land for the elementary school which bears her husband's name. She also sold, at a reduced price, the property for Albert Leonard Junior High School. The remaining 62 acres of the Ward estate were purchased by the City with the help of funds from a New York State bond issue, and became Ward Acres Park.

== New York, Westchester and Boston Railroad ==
The New York, Westchester and Boston Railway was a commuter railroad company which operated several lines between New York and Westchester County between 1912 and 1937. Its railway tracks ran through the north end of the Ward property and both the Dickerman and Ward families used the railroad during their ownership. A short rail spur, known as a siding, from the main tracks of the NYW&B enabled the loading and unloading of horses and associated farm equipment. The concrete block outbuilding near Broadfield Road, now commonly referred to as ‘The Forge’, was located adjacent to the siding. Although the former rail bed is evident within the park, few other physical remnants still exist.
