= Sheldrake Lake (New York) =

Lake in New York, United States

- Location within New York Location within the United States
- Location: New Rochelle, New York
- Coordinates: 40°57′07″N 073°46′23″W
- Catchment area: 2.66 sq mi (6.9 km^{2})
- Basin countries: United States
- Surface area: 25 acres (10 ha)
- Surface elevation: 129 ft (39 m)

Sheldrake Lake is a man-made body of water located in the north-eastern section of New Rochelle in Westchester County, New York. It has a surface area of 25 acres and formerly served as the water supply for neighboring Larchmont village. The lake is the result of Larchmont Water Company Dam #2 on the Sheldrake River. The dam, constructed in 1935, is masonry with a height of 31 feet (9.4 m) and a length of 1,000 feet (300 m). The dam has a maximum discharge is 987 cubic feet (27.9 m^{3}) per second and drains an area of 2.66 square miles (6.9 km^{2}).

== History ==
The value of the water power of the Sheldrake River was recognized at an early date, and its development was primarily due to the work of Quakers who lived in the north-eastern portion of New Rochelle. In 1754 Nehemiah Palmer appears to have been the founder of the mill and he erected a saw-mill at the site of the lake in 1754. He gave the mill to his grandson Drake Palmer, and ratified this early gift in his will dated 1760. In 1774 Drake Palmer sold the mill to his brother, Aaron Palmer, and a grist-mill was added to the site. Both mills remained in operation by various owners for over a century. In 1876, under the ownership of John T.Goodlife, the mill dam was improved to enlarge the area of the pond so as to develop its use in the ice industry. The various enterprises of the mills continued until they were ultimately sold to Charles H. Murray who promoted the sites use by the Larchmont Water Company.

By the 1880s, Larchmont residents' wells had proved inadequate and a new source needed to be found. The company bought Goodliffe Pond and later added Sheldrake Pond, a small water body on the site of today's Sheldrake Lake. The company laid water pipes from Goodliffe Pond to Larchmont down a route that is now Murray Avenue. In 1889 the first piped Sheldrake River water began to flow into Larchmont Manor. In 1893 the water company bought lands surrounding Sheldrake Pond from several owners, and obtained the right to raise the water level of the pond by 24.3 feet. In 1897, excavation began around Sheldrake Pond to enlarge its capacity. In 1900, expert stonemasons from Italy began construction on the big Upper Dam and spillway, which was completed by 1903.

== Watershed ==
The Sheldrake River drains a watershed whose upstream portions cover parts of Scarsdale and New Rochelle. The river supplies both Sheldrake Lake, and the smaller Goodliffe Pond to its east. It then flows under Weaver Street, and through Mamaroneck Town before ultimately joining the larger Mamaroneck River which empties into Mamaroneck Harbor and Long Island Sound.

== Conservancy ==
Today the lake is part of a 60-acre conservancy, permanently protected from development. It is an important resource for the neighboring communities which offers a unique wildlife habitat and a zone for nature-related study and recreation. Wildlife at the lake includes ducks and Canada geese.
