= City School District of New Rochelle =

School district in the U.S. state of New York

Location
- New Rochelle, New York

District information
- Type: Public
- Grades: PK–12
- Superintendent: Dr. Corey W. Reynolds

Students and staff
- Students: 9,800+

Other information
- Website: http://www.nred.org

The City School District of New Rochelle is a public school district located in New Rochelle, New York. New Rochelle has one of the most extensive educational systems in Westchester County, comprising a high school, two middle schools, six elementary schools, and one pre-k through second grade Early Childhood Center. The district enrollment is 9,800+ students in 10 schools in grades Pre-K through 12th grade. The annual budget is $370,000,000+ in 2026-27, with a per-pupil expenditure of $35,000+.

Schools in the district have received the Blue Ribbon Award from the U.S. Department of Education on multiple occasions, including in 1983, 1984, 1993, 1994, 1995, 1996 and 1998.

New Rochelle has also been named one of the "Best 100 Communities for Music Education" in the nation by the American Music Conference. In 2007 the Westchester Arts Council presented the district with its "Arts Award for Education" in recognition of the City and school district’s extraordinary commitment to the arts.

== History ==
New Rochelle was the scene of the first court-ordered school desegregation case in "the North" when the United States Supreme Court decided in the 1961 Taylor v. Board of Education of New Rochelle New York court case that its Lincoln School boundaries had been intentionally drawn to create segregated elementary school districts. Lincoln School was closed and demolished in 1965, with students of that district allowed to attend other elementary schools in the city. The school district is known for its diversity, and the high school honors civil rights leader Whitney Young in the name of its auditorium and civil rights martyr Michael Schwerner in the name of its library.

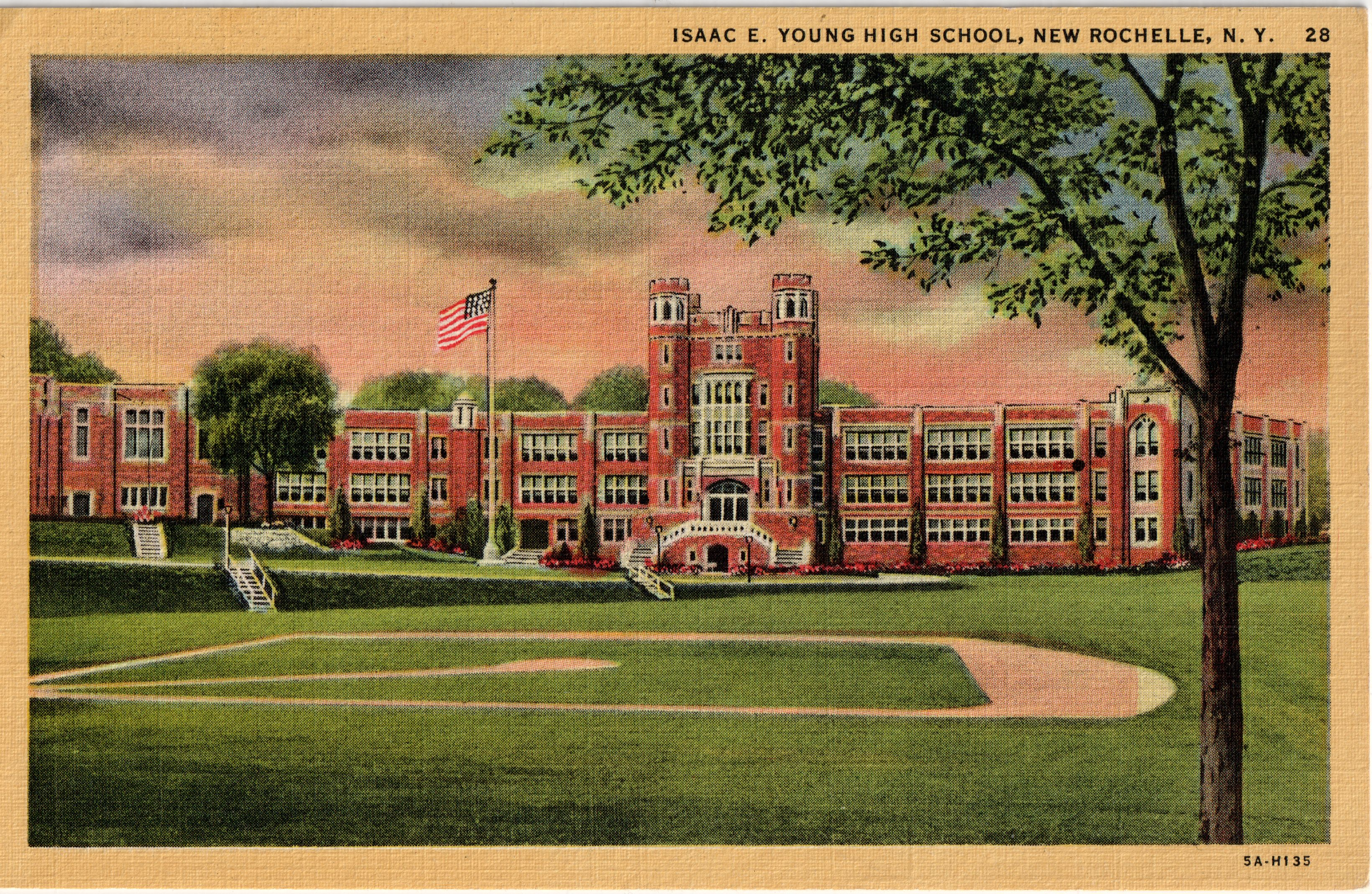
Isaac E. Young High School in New Rochelle, NY, showing baseball field, circa 1940s

In May 1968, New Rochelle High School was partially destroyed by a fire set by a disturbed student. The fire occurred early in the morning and there were no fatalities. The facade of the school remained intact, allowing builders to construct a new building behind the original exterior.

In 1981 four of the district's elementary schools were closed due to declining enrollment: Mayflower, Roosevelt, Barnard, and Stephenson. Their students were transferred to Ward, Davis, and Trinity elementary schools.

=== Notable alumni ===
Notable alumni sorted by graduation date.

- Edward A. Batchelor (Unknown graduation date), sportswriter and charter member of the Baseball Writers' Association of America
- Elia Kazan 1926 - Academy Award-winning director
- James Gregory 1930 - stage, screen and TV actor
- Marion West Higgins 1932 - first female Speaker of the New Jersey General Assembly
- Henry Heimlich 1937 - inventor of the Heimlich Maneuver
- Edward Wellen 1937 - mystery and science fiction writer
- Gloria Oden 1939 - African American poet
- Don Hewitt 1940 - producer of 60 Minutes
- Jerome Kohlberg, Jr. 1943 - billionaire, and co-founder of private equity firms KKR and Kohlberg & Co.
- Lou Jones 1950 - Olympic gold medalist
- Louis Rukeyser 1950 - TV personality, economic commentator
- Jesse Arnelle 1950 - football and basketball player at Penn State University
- Leslie H. Gelb 1955 - President of the Council on Foreign Relations
- Harry Macklowe 1955 - Chairman and CEO of Macklowe Properties Real Estate Investment
- William S. Rukeyser 1957 - journalist
- Johnny Counts 1958 - played professional football for the New York Giants
- Drew S. Days, III 1959 - Solicitor General of the United States, Professor of Law at Yale Law School
- Lawrence M. Small 1959 - 11th Secretary of the Smithsonian Institution
- Richard Roundtree 1961 - actor - John Shaft
- Barrie M. Osborne 1962 - 2004 Academy Award-winning film producer (Lord of the Rings)
- Claude "Butch" Harmon, Jr. 1962 - golf professional and former coach of Tiger Woods
- Andrea Mitchell 1963 - journalist
- Russell T. Lewis 1965 - CEO of The New York Times Company
- George Starke 1966 - Washington Redskins - Tackle - "Head Hog"
- Alan Menken 1967 - composer, lyricist
- Jeralyn Merritt 1967 - criminal defense attorney, legal analyst, blogger
- Guy Davis 1970 - musician, son of actors Ossie Davis and Ruby Dee
- Gloria Borger 1970 - CBS special correspondent
- Christopher Edley, Jr. 1970 - Dean of University of California, Berkeley School of Law (Boalt Hall)
- Michael Kaiser 1971 - President of the John F. Kennedy Center for the Performing Arts
- Glynnis O'Connor 1973 - actress
- Rachel Vail 1984 - children's author
- Clifford J. Levy 1985 - Pulitzer Prize-winning journalist
- Craig Carton 1987 - sports radio personality
- Devon Hughes 1990 - professional wrestler known as "Brother Devon" (formerly known as "D-Von Dudley")
- Cristina Teuscher 1996 - Olympic gold medalist swimmer
- Jennifer Hyman 1998 - entrepreneur
- Tom Koehler 2004 - Miami Marlins Pitcher
- Courtney Greene 2005 - Jacksonville Jaguars free safety
- Ray Rice 2005 - Baltimore Ravens Running back. Reserve on 2009 AFC Pro Bowl team. Super Bowl XLVII champion
- Edson Buddle - US National Soccer Team

== Schools ==
=== High schools ===
- New Rochelle High School
- Huguenot Academy Alternative Campus High School at 140 Huguenot Street, on the campus of Monroe College in New Rochelle. 61 students are currently enrolled there.

=== Middle schools ===
- Albert Leonard Middle School - students from Daniel Webster Elementary School, George M. Davis Elementary School, and William B. Ward Elementary School
- Isaac E. Young Middle School - students from Columbus Elementary School, Jefferson Elementary School, and Trinity Elementary School

=== Elementary schools ===
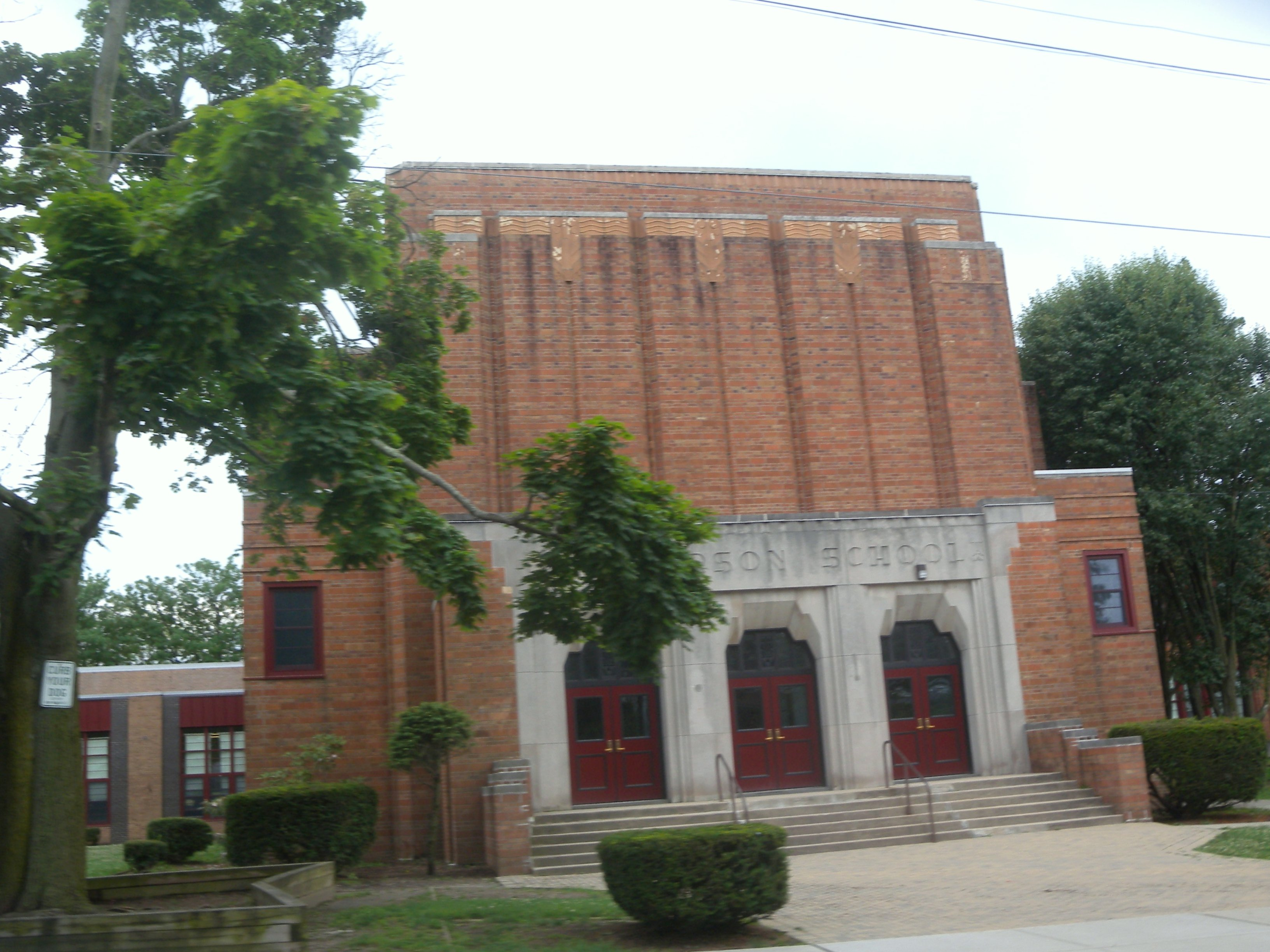
Jefferson Elementary

- Jefferson Elementary School
- George M. Davis Elementary School
- Trinity Elementary School
- William B. Ward Elementary School
- Daniel Webster Elementary School - offers a Humanities magnet program
- Columbus Elementary School - offers a Science, Math and Technology magnet program
- Henry Barnard Early Childhood Center - offers a magnet program for pre-kindergarten through Second grade students, following the Reggio Emilia approach, and houses the district's Pre-School Speech Language Learning Center.
