= Calhoun =

Calhoun may refer to:

== People ==
- Calhoun (surname)
  - John C. Calhoun (1782–1850), seventh vice president of the United States
  - Keith Calhoun (born 1955), American photographer
- Calhoun Ancrum (1915–1990), American intelligence officer, newspaper columnist and Episcopal minister

== Places ==
=== United States ===
- Calhoun, Alabama, an unincorporated community
- Calhoun, Columbia County, Arkansas, an unincorporated community
- Calhoun, Lincoln County, Arkansas, an unincorporated community
- Calhoun, Georgia, a city
- Calhoun, Illinois, a village
- Calhoun, Kentucky, a home rule-class city
- Calhoun, Louisiana, an unincorporated community and census-designated place
- Calhoun, Missouri, a city
- Calhoun, Oklahoma, an unincorporated community
- Clemson, South Carolina, originally named Calhoun
- Calhoun, Tennessee, a town
- Calhoun, West Virginia, an unincorporated community
- Calhoun, Wisconsin, a neighborhood of New Berlin
- Calhoun County (disambiguation)
- Calhoun Township, Calhoun County, Iowa
- Calhoun Township, Cheyenne County, Kansas
- Fort Wool, Virginia, originally named Castle Calhoun or Fort Calhoun, a former island fortification
- Lake Calhoun (Kandiyohi County, Minnesota)
- Lake Calhoun, Minnesota, now called Bde Maka Ska
- Calhoun Hollow, Montgomery County, Missouri, a valley
- Calhoun Mine, Lumpkin County, Georgia, on the National Register of Historic Places and a National Historic Landmark

=== Canada ===
- Calhoun, New Brunswick, an unincorporated community

== Schools in the United States ==
- Grace Hopper College of Yale University, known as Calhoun College until 2017
- Calhoun Community College, Decatur, Alabama, a public community college
- Calhoun High School (disambiguation), including Calhoun County High School
- Calhoun Middle School (disambiguation)
- Calhoun School, New York City
- Calhoun Colored School (1892–1945), a former private boarding and day school for Black students in Calhoun, Alabama
- Calhoun Academy (Mississippi), a private school in Pittsboro, Mississippi
- Calhoun Academy (South Carolina), a private school in St. Matthews, South Carolina
- John C. Calhoun Academy, former name of Colleton Preparatory Academy, a private school in Walterboro, South Carolina,

== Ships ==
- USS Calhoun, a Confederate steamer and blockade runner captured by the Union Navy in the American Civil War
- USS John C. Calhoun, a ballistic missile submarine
- USCGC Calhoun, a United States Coast Guard cutter

== Other uses ==
- Calhoun Correctional Institution, Blountstown, Calhoun County, Florida, United States, a state prison for men
- Calhoun State Prison, Morgan, Calhoun County, Georgia, United States
- Calhoun Hall, a building on the University of Texas at Austin campus
- Calhoun Apartments, Springfield, Massachusetts, on the National Register of Historic Places
- Calhoun Farmhouse, west of Ruston, Louisiana, United States, on the National Register of Historic Places
- Calhoun House (disambiguation)
- Calhoun Hotel, Seattle, Washington, United States, on the National Register of Historic Places
- Calhoun Mill, a historic grist mill near Mount Carmel, McCormick County, South Carolina, United States, on the National Register of Historic Places
- Calhoun station, Calhoun, Georgia, a former railway station, on the National Register of Historic Places

== See also ==
- Calhoun County Airport (disambiguation)
- Cahoon, a variant of the name
- Colhoun (disambiguation), a variant of the name
- Colquhoun (disambiguation)
- Kahloon (disambiguation), a similarly pronounced surname
