= Calhoun (surname) =

Calhoun is a surname of Scottish origin. It is a variant of the Scottish surname Colquhoun. Notable people with this surname include:

== In arts and entertainment ==
- Adam Calhoun (born 1980), American rapper and songwriter
- Alice Calhoun (1900–1966), American silent film actress
- Ann Marie Calhoun (born 1979), American violinist
- Chad Calhoun, a pseudonym of Ron Goulart (1933–2022), writer
- Eddie Calhoun (1921–1994), American jazz bassist
- Kutt Calhoun (born 1977), born Melvin Calhoun, musician
- Monica Calhoun (born 1971), American film and television actress
- Rory Calhoun (1922–1999), American actor
- Will Calhoun (born 1964), American musician
- William "Haystack" Calhoun (1934–1989), American professional wrestler
- William Henry Calhoun (1815–1865), American silversmith

== In government, politics and activism ==
- Bob Calhoun (1937–2020), American politician and lawyer
- Bootsie Calhoun (1923–2014), American politician
- Charles Calhoun Jr. (1931–2014), American politician and jurist
- Christopher Calhoun, American politician
- Cora Catherine Calhoun Horne (1865–1932), Black suffragist, civil rights activist, and an Atlanta socialite
- Floride Calhoun (1792–1866), wife of John C. Calhoun, second lady of the United States
- Harlan M. Calhoun (1903–1977), justice of the Supreme Court of Appeals of West Virginia
- James Calhoun (politician, born 1802) (1802–1852), Georgia politician, Army colonel, federal Indian agent, and Territorial Governor of New Mexico
- John A. Calhoun (1918–2000), American diplomat
- John C. Calhoun (1782–1850), United States politician and 7th Vice President
- Riemer Calhoun (1909–1994), American politician
- William Lowndes Calhoun (1837–1908), mayor of Atlanta, Georgia in 1879

== In sport ==
- Cameron Calhoun (born 2004), American football player
- Don Calhoun (1952–2020), American football running back
- George Whitney Calhoun (1890–1963), American newspaper editor, co-founder of the Green Bay Packers NFL football team
- Jalon Calhoun (born 2000), American football player
- Jermie Calhoun (born 1988), running back for the Oklahoma Sooners
- Jim Calhoun (born 1942), head coach of the University of Connecticut men's basketball team
- Kole Calhoun (born 1987), American Major League Baseball player
- Lee Calhoun (1933–1989), American hurdler
- Milo Calhoun (1940–1995), Jamaican boxer of the 1960s and '70s
- Shaq Calhoun (born 1996), American football player
- Tom Calhoun (born 1950), American sportscaster
- Thomas Calhoun (1795–1861), English clergyman and cricketer
- William "Haystack" Calhoun (1934–1989), American professional wrestler
- W. Bret Calhoun (born 1964), American racehorse trainer
- Willie Calhoun (born 1994), American baseball player

== In other fields ==
- Ben Calhoun (born 1979), American radio reporter
- Cheshire Calhoun (fl. 1980s–2020s), American philosopher
- Craig Calhoun (born 1952), American sociologist
- David L. Calhoun (born 1957), American businessman, formerly president and chief executive of Boeing from 2020 to 2024
- Frances Boyd Calhoun (1867–1909) American author
- James Calhoun (soldier) (1845–1876), American soldier, killed at the Battle of Little Bighorn
- John B. Calhoun (1917–1995), American ethologist

== Fictional characters ==
- Barney Calhoun, fictional character from the Half-Life computer game series
- Mackenzie Calhoun, fictional character from Star Trek
- Daltry Calhoun, the leading character of the 2005 movie of the same name
- Noah Calhoun, fictional character played by Ryan Gosling in the 2004 movie The Notebook based on the novel by Nicholas Sparks
- Rutherford Calhoun, the protagonist of the novel Middle Passage by Charles Johnson
- Sergeant Tamora J. Calhoun, the protagonist of the video arcade game "Hero's Duty" in the Disney animated film Wreck-It Ralph
- Anika Calhoun, fictional character played by Grace Gealey in Empire (2015 TV series)
- Captain Cassius Calhoun, leading character of The Headless Horseman, an 1866 adventure novel by Mayne Reid
- Coach Calhoun, fictional character in the film Grease
- Dean Ernie Calhoun, fictional character in the YouTube web series Video Game High School
- Bill Calhoun, one of three founders of Caesar's Legion, a faction in the video game Fallout: New Vegas
