= Colquhoun =

Colquhoun (/kəˈhuːn/ kə-HOON) is a habitational surname of Scottish origin, derived from the lands of Colquhoun, which lay east of Dumbarton. In 1241, the Earl of Lennox granted these lands to one Umfridus de Kilpatrick, whose descendants assumed the name de Colquhoun. The place name may derive from the Gaelic cùil chumhann, meaning "narrow corner"; alternatively, the first element may be coille, "wood".

The l is typically silent, in accordance with the Scottish tendency to drop this letter (see l-vocalization). The trigraph ⟨quh⟩ represents [h] in the modern pronunciation of the name, but originally stood for [xw].

Variants of the name, showing simplification of the spelling, include Colhoun, Calhoun, Cohoon, Cahoon, Kahoun, etc.

People with the surname include:

- Alan Colquhoun (1921–2012), English architect, historian, critic and teacher
- Albert Alexander Colquhoun (fl. 1926–1929), Canadian politician
- Alexander John Colquhoun (1868–1951), Canadian politician
- Alexander Colquhoun (artist) (1862–1941), Scottish-born Australian painter, illustrator and art critic
- Alva Colquhoun (1942–2025), Australian freestyle and butterfly swimmer
- Amalie Sara Colquhoun (1894–1974), Australian landscape and portrait painter
- A. R. Colquhoun (1848–1914), British explorer and first administrator of Southern Rhodesia
- Archibald Colquhoun (politician) (1756–1820), Scottish politician and lawyer
- Archibald Colquhoun (translator) (1912–1964), translator of modern Italian literature into English
- Arjen Colquhoun (born 1992), former Canadian football player
- Calvin Colquhoun (born 1996), Scottish footballer
- Christian Colquhoun, special effects designer
- Christopher Colquhoun (born 1970), English actor
- Colin Colquhoun (born 1932), former Australian rules footballer
- Connor Colquhoun, Welsh YouTuber
- David Colquhoun (born 1936), English pharmacologist
- Davie Colquhoun (1906–1983), Scottish footballer
- Duncan Colquhoun (1915–2005), Scottish footballer
- Eddie Colquhoun (1945–2023), Scottish footballer
- Edward Alexander Colquhoun (1844–1904), Canadian politician, mayor of Hamilton, Ontario
- Frances Colquhoun (actress) (1938–2017), Scottish actress, singer and theatre director
- Frances Mary Colquhoun (1836–1920), Scottish writer
- Frank Colquhoun (1909–1997), Church of England priest and author
- Glenn Colquhoun (born 1964), New Zealand poet and general practitioner
- Howard Colquhoun (born 1951), English professor of chemistry
- Hugh Colquhoun (1892–1949), Australian rules footballer
- Sir Iain Colquhoun, 7th Baronet (1887–1948), Scottish landowner and First World War British Army officer
- Ian Colquhoun (1924–2005), New Zealand cricketer
- Ian Colquhoun (Scottish author), Scottish author, stuntman and actor
- Ithell Colquhoun, English surrealist painter
- Ivar Colquhoun (1916–2008), Scottish noble
- James Colquhoun (disambiguation)
- Jane Colquhoun (fl. 1566), fool at the court of Mary, Queen of Scots
- Janet Colquhoun (1781–1846), Scottish religious writer and philanthropist
- Jesse Colquhoun (born 2001), Australian rugby league footballer
- Joe Colquhoun (1926–1987), English comics artist
- John Colquhoun (disambiguation)
- Kathryn Colquhoun (1884–1958), Canadian writer
- Leroy Colquhoun (born 1980), Jamaican former sprinter
- Les Colquhoun (1921–2001), Royal Air Force photographic reconnaissance pilot during the Second World War, test pilot and hovercraft pioneer
- Ludovic Colquhoun (1804–1882), also known as Ludwig Colquhoun, Republic of Texas senator and merchant
- Margaret Colquhoun (1947–2017), English evolutionary biologist
- Maureen Colquhoun (1928–2021), English economist and politician
- Patrick Colquhoun (1745–1820), Scottish merchant, statistician, magistrate and founder of the first regular preventive police force in England
- Patrick Colquhoun (lawyer) (1815–1891), British diplomat, legal writer and sculler, grandson of the above
- Percy Colquhoun (1866–1936), Australian politician and tennis player
- Robert Colquhoun (disambiguation)
- Sam Colquhoun (born 1994), former Australian rules footballer
- Sophie Colquhoun, 21st-century English actress
- William Colquhoun (1814–1898), Canadian businessman and politician

== In fiction ==
In British television detective drama Midsomer Murders episode nr. 61 "Blood Wedding" (S11E2) there is a character called Randall Colquhoun (Simon Paisley Day). This upper class gentleman is a friend of the Fitzroy family. When DS Ben Jones (Jason Hughes) is trying to ask questions from Mr Colquhoun, he at first pronounces his name Col-q-houn, on which he's being pretty arrogantly corrected. Later on, when DS Jones arrests Mr 'Cahoon', Jones pronounces his name incorrectly, stressing the middle syllable 'Col-que-houn' – and this time he does it just to wind him up.
