= Art in the Negro Schools =

1940 film

- Directed by: Kenneth F. Space
- Cinematography: Kenneth F. Space
- Production company: Harmon Foundation
- Release date: 1940
- Running time: 19 minutes
- Country: United States
- Language: Silent (English intertitles)

Art in the Negro Schools is a 1940 American black and white, silent documentary film produced by the Harmon Foundation as part of its "Negro Education for American Living" series. With a 19-minute runtime, the film was directed and shot by famed documentary cinematographer Kenneth F. Space.

The film depicts African American students engaging in both the fine arts and performing arts at the now-defunct Calhoun Colored School in Calhoun, Alabama and at historically black colleges and universities including Dillard University of New Orleans, Louisiana, Fisk University of Nashville, Tennessee, Hampton Institute (now Hampton University of Hampton, Virginia, and Howard University of Washington, DC. argues in favor of exposing students to performing and fine arts by demonstrating the positive impact those arts have on the students' lives. The film is held at the Library of Congress, the National Film Preservation Foundation, and in the National Archives as part of the Harmon Foundation Collection.

== Cast and Crew ==
- Kenneth F. Space - Director and Cinematographer
- Harmon Foundation - Producer
