= Cahoon =

Cahoon is a surname. Notable people with the surname include:

- Ben Cahoon (born 1972), football player in the CFL
- Elizabeth K. Cahoon, Georgian-American epidemiologist
- Frank Kell Cahoon (1934–2013), American businessman and politician
- Kevin Cahoon (born 1971), American actor, singer and songwriter
- Lauren Cahoon (born 1985), Taekwondo martial artist
- Martha Cahoon (1905–1999), American artist
- Mary Odile Cahoon (1929–2011), American nun and scientist
- Ralph Cahoon (1910–1982), artist and furniture decorator
- Reynolds Cahoon (1790–1861), Latter-day Saint builder of Kirtland Temple
- Richard Cahoon (1905–1985), American film editor
- Tiny Cahoon (1900–1973), American football player
- William Cahoon (1774–1833), United States politician from Vermont

== See also ==
- Cahoon Museum of American Art
- Sera Cahoone
- Cohoon, a variant of the name
- Calhoun (disambiguation), a variant of the name
- Colquhoun, a variant spelling of Cahoon
- Clan Colquhoun, a Scottish Clan
