= James Colquhoun =

James Colquhoun may refer to:

- Sir James Colquhoun, 3rd Baronet, of Colquhoun (died c. 1680), of the Colquhoun baronets
- Sir James Colquhoun, 4th Baronet, of Colquhoun (died c. 1688), of the Colquhoun baronets
- Sir James Colquhoun, 1st Baronet (1714–1786), of the Colquhoun baronets
- Sir James Colquhoun, 2nd Baronet (1741–1805), of the Colquhoun baronets
- James Colquhoun (diplomat) (1780–1855)
- Sir James Colquhoun, 3rd Baronet, of Luss (1774–1836), MP for Dunbartonshire 1799–1806
- Sir James Colquhoun, 4th Baronet, of Luss (1804–1873), MP for Dunbartonshire 1837–41, Lord Lieutenant of Dunbartonshire
- Sir James Colquhoun, 5th Baronet (1844–1907), of the Colquhoun baronets, Lord Lieutenant of Dunbartonshire
- James Colquhoun (cricketer) (1893–1977), Scottish cricketer and British Army officer

== See also ==
- Colquhoun (surname)
