= Colquhoun (disambiguation) =

Colquhoun is a surname. It may also refer to:

- Colquhoun Grant (British cavalry general) (1772–1835), British Army lieutenant-general in the Napoleonic Wars
- Colquhoun Grant (British intelligence officer) (1780–1829), British Army lieutenant-colonel and Napoleonic Wars intelligence officer
- Clan Colquhoun, a Highland Scottish clan
- Colquhoun baronets, two baronetcies, one in the Baronetage of Nova Scotia and one in the Baronetage of Great Britain
- Colquhoun Peak, a mountain in Washington state, United States
- Colquhoun railway station, Victoria, Australia, a former railway station
