= Calhoun School, The Way to a Better Future =

1940 black and white documentary film

- Directed by: Kenneth F. Space
- Produced by: Harmon Foundation
- Release date: 1940

Calhoun School, The Way to a Better Future is a 1940 black and white documentary film about Calhoun Colored School in Calhoun, Alabama, Lowndes County, Alabama. Directed and filmed by Kenneth F. Space and produced by the Harmon Foundation, the film displays impoverished communities in Alabama and the role the Calhoun Colored School played building rural infrastructure and African American healthcare in rural Alabama. The film is held in the National Archive as part of the Harmon Foundation Collection and its "Negro Schools for American Living" series.

== Plot ==
The film includes scenes of impoverished areas of Lowndes County, Alabama such as the "Big Swamp" area. The film then highlights the Calhoun Colored School and its mission to improve outcomes for African American children. The film also show numerous scenes of African American adults and children going about their daily life, including school principal, Dr. Jerome F. Kidder. The film concludes with African American children marching and performing a flag ceremony.

== Cast and Crew ==
- Kenneth F. Space, Director and Cinematographer
- Jerome F. Kidder, Principal of the Calhoun Colored School as himself
