= Towards the Horizon =

Towards the Horizon may refer to:

- Towards the Horizon (composition), a cello concerto by the composer Einojuhani Rautavaara
- Towards the Horizon (film), a 1949 black and white documentary film
