= Senator Calhoun (disambiguation) =

John C. Calhoun (1782–1850) was a U.S. senator from South Carolina from 1845 to 1850. Senator Calhoun may also refer to:

- Bob Calhoun (1937–2020), Virginia State Senate
- Charles Calhoun Jr. (1931–2014), Texas State Senate
- James Calhoun (politician, born 1802) (1802–1852), Georgia State Senate
- Riemer Calhoun (1909–1994), Louisiana State Senate
- William B. Calhoun (1796–1865), Massachusetts State Senate
