= Charles Calhoun =

Charles Calhoun could refer to:

- Charles Calhoun Jr. (1931–2014), American jurist and legislator
- Charles L. Calhoun (1925–2002), Master Chief Petty Officer of the U.S. Coast Guard
- Charles W. Calhoun, American historian
- Chuck Calhoun (1901–1999), pseudonym of American musician and songwriter Jesse Stone
