= Frances Colquhoun =

Frances Colquhoun may refer to:

- Frances Colquhoun (actress) (1938–2017), Scottish actress, singer and theatre director
- Frances Mary Colquhoun (1836–1920), Scottish writer
