= Kenneth F. Space =

- Born: 1903
- Died: 1971 (aged 67–68)

Kenneth F. Space (1903–1971) was a pictorial journalist, documentary filmmaker, cinematographer and commercial photographer in the 1930s and 1940s. He is most known with his photographic and documentary film work capturing African American life in the American South for the Harmon Foundation.

From 1929 to 1931, Space worked for Agfa-Ansco, a film and camera manufacturer. He later worked at IBM in their national archives.

A skilled still photographer and motion picture cinematographer, Space worked with the Harmon Foundation in the 1930s and 1940s, producing numerous photographs and several documentaries focused on the activities of African Americans in the American South including daily life, education and art.

His "Harmon Foundation Collection: Kenneth Space Photographs of the Activities of Southern Black Americans", which resides in the National Archive, captures the academic and social life of students in the 1930s and 1940s at several Historically Black Colleges and Universities including Atlanta University (now Clark Atlanta University in Atlanta Georgia, Xavier University of Louisiana in New Orleans, Louisiana, Dillard University in New Orleans, Louisiana, Fisk University in Nashville, Tennessee, Hampton Institute (now Hampton University) in Hampton, Virginia, Howard University in Washington, D.C., Shaw University in Raleigh, North Carolina, Talladega College in Talladega, Alabama, Tuskegee Institute (now Tuskegee University) in Tuskegee, Alabama, and Virginia Union University in Richmond, Virginia. His photographs also include those of many prominent African American scholars and leaders including Bethune Cookman's Mary McLeod Bethune, Atlanta University's Dr. W. E. B. DuBois, Tuskegee Institute's George Washington Carver, 1936 Olympian and former Congressman Ralph Metcalfe of Xavier University of Louisiana, and Lift Every Voice and Sing songwriter and Fisk University professor James Weldon Johnson. Space's 1941 photograph of famed African American painter Jacob Lawrence was featured prominently in the Seattle Art Museum's exhibit of Lawrence's famous Migration Series, Lawrence's series of paintings depicting the African American migration from the American South in the 1910s to the northern United States.

Space died in 1971.

== Films ==
- Not One Word (1934)
- As We Forgive (1936)
- China's Gifts to the West (1936)
- Our Children's Money (1936)
- How to Use Your Camera (1938)
- Film Editing (1939)
- Even In This Day and Age (1939)
- Common Mistakes and Their Correction (1939)
- How to Use Filters (1940)
- Calhoun School, The Way to a Better Future (1940)
- Art In the Negro Schools (1940)
- Exposure and Exposure Meters (1940)
- Lenses and Their Uses (1940)
- Fluffy, the Kitten (1940)
- Work and Contemplation (1941)
- Towards the Horizon (Film) (1949)

== Awards ==
- ACL Ten Best 1934
- ACL Ten Best 1936 – Special Class
- ACL Ten Best 1938 – Special Class
- ACL Ten Best 1939 – Honorable Mention Special Class
- ACL Ten Best 1940 – General Class
- ACL Ten Best 1940 – Honorable Mention Special Class
