= Nate Dickinson =

American biologist (1932–2011)

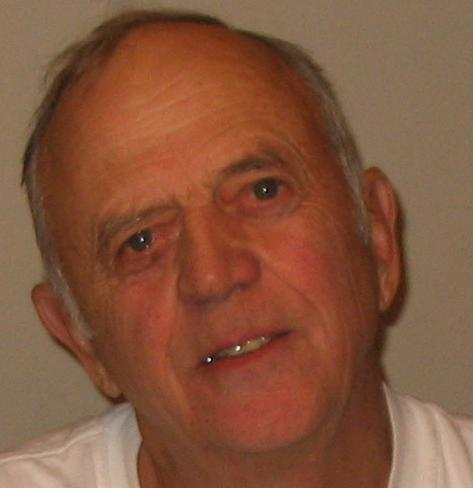
- Picture taken January 14, 2005 (73rd birthday)
- Born: January 14, 1932; New York, New York
- Died: June 15, 2011 (aged 79)

Nathaniel "Nate" Rogers Dickinson (January 14, 1932 – June 15, 2011) was an American wildlife biologist, and author of Common Sense Wildlife Management: Discourses on Personal Experiences, was published in 1993 by Settle Hill Publishing.

== Early life ==
Dickinson was born in New York City to painter, Sidney Dickinson and Mary Watson Dickinson and raised and educated in Pleasantville, N.Y. He graduated from Amherst College in 1953 and received a master's degree in wildlife management from Cornell University in 1955. After two years in the army as a signal corps cryptographer, he served as a wildlife biologist in Maine and in 1961 left to become a big game project leader for the New York State Department of Environmental Conservation.
