= Calhoun High School =

Calhoun High School is the name of various American secondary schools:

- Calhoun High School (Alabama), Calhoun, Alabama
- Calhoun High School (Georgia), Calhoun, Georgia
- Calhoun County High School (Edison, Georgia)
- Calhoun High School (Illinois), Hardin, Illinois
- Sanford H. Calhoun High School, Merrick, New York
- Calhoun County High School, St. Matthews, South Carolina
- Calhoun High School (Texas), Port Lavaca, Texas
- Calhoun County Middle-High School (West Virginia), Mount Zion, West Virginia

== See also ==
- Calhoun School, New York City
- Calhoun Colored School, Calhoun, Alabama
