= Colhoun =

Colhoun, a surname of Scottish origin, is a variant of the surname Colquhoun. Colhoun may refer to:

== People ==
- Edmund Colhoun (1821–1897), admiral in the U.S. Navy
- John E. Colhoun (1750–1802), U.S. senator and lawyer from South Carolina
- John Colhoun (plant pathologist) (1913–2002), British mycologist, phytopathologist, and professor of cryptogamic botany
- Mabel Colhoun (1905–1992), Irish photographer, teacher and archaeologist
- Ossie Colhoun (born 1938), Irish cricketer

== Places ==
- Lumsden (Colhoun) Airport, Saskatchewan, Canada
- Calhoun College, a college of Yale University

== Ships ==
- USS Colhoun (DD-85), a U.S. Navy destroyer 1918-1942
- USS Colhoun (DD-801), a U.S. Navy destroyer 1944-1945

== See also ==
- Calhoun (disambiguation), variant name
- Colquhoun, variant name
