= Louis Betts =

American painter

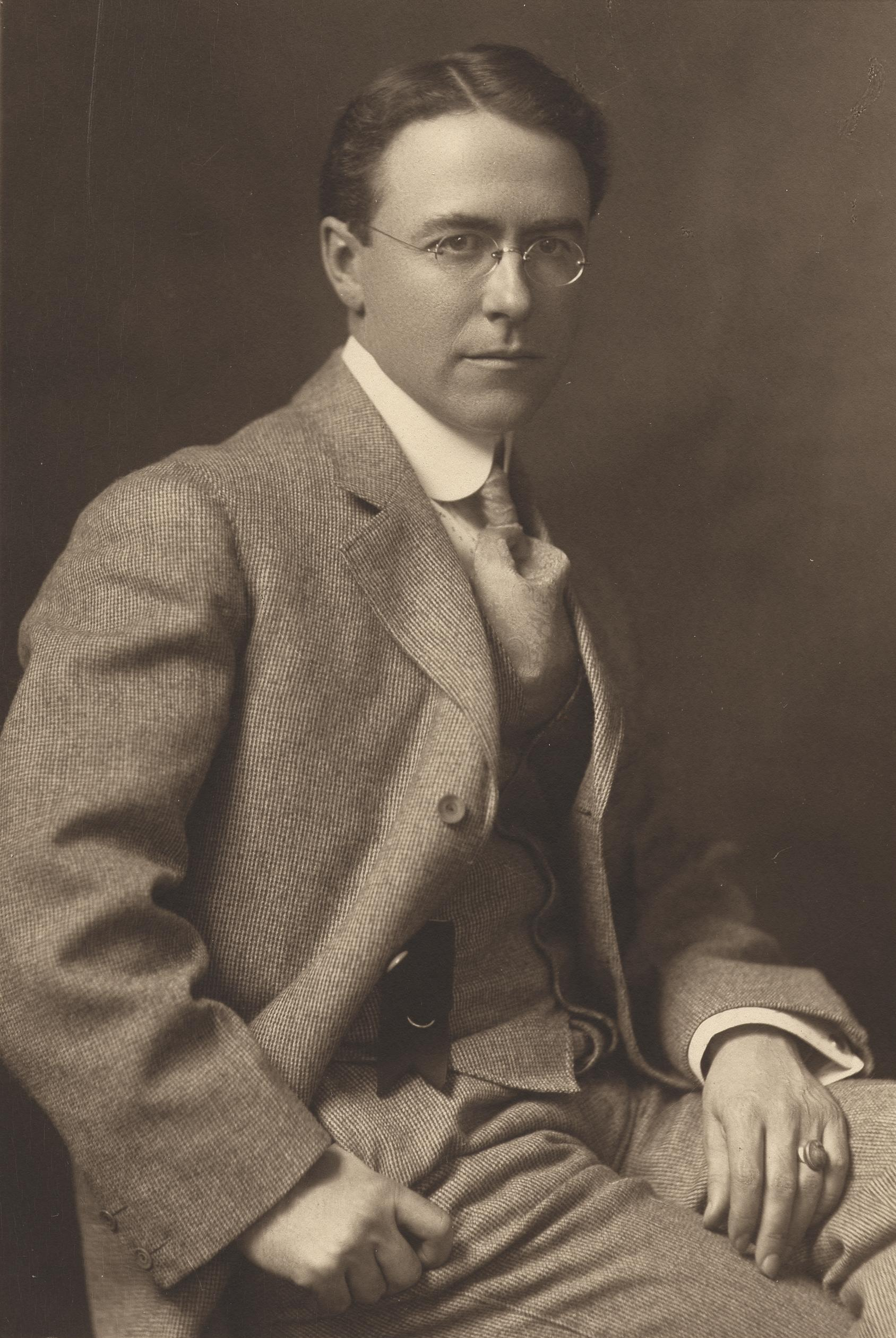
- Born: October 5, 1873; Little Rock, Arkansas, US
- Died: August 13, 1961 (aged 87)

Louis Betts (October 5, 1873 – August 13, 1961) was an American portrait painter.

== Biography ==
Betts was born in Little Rock, Arkansas. His father was an artist who remarried after Louis' mother died. His family moved to Chicago where his three younger siblings were born. Betts was able to continue his study of art as did his siblings.

Betts studied with William Merritt Chase at the Pennsylvania Academy of Fine Arts in 1894, worked in Chicago and New York, and was made a full member of the National Academy of Design by 1915. He served as president of the Salmagundi Club and vice president of the National Institute of Arts and Letters. His portrait subjects included Doctors William J. and Charles H. Mayo, George Eastman, George Mundelein, and J. Hamilton Lewis.

He died on August 13, 1961.

== Bibliography ==
- Michael Huey Dearie — The Louis Betts Portrait of Harriet King Huey, Schlebrügge, Vienna 2011. ISBN 978-3-85160-196-1
