= Richard Pionk =

American artist (1936–2007)

- Born: Richard Cletus Pionk; April 26, 1936; Moose Lake, Minnesota, U.S.
- Died: June 5, 2007 (aged 71)
- Education: Art Students League of New York
- Occupation: Artist
- Style: Pastel, oil painting

Richard Cletus Pionk (April 26, 1936 – June 5, 2007) was an American artist who worked in the media of pastels and oil painting and who lived, worked and taught in New York City. Pionk studied classical still-life painting by spending hours in museums. He studied still-life painting in the Brooklyn Museum and other New York museums as well as the École du Louvre in Paris. Pionk studied the works of Jean-Baptiste-Siméon Chardin, Antoine Vollon, and Henri Fantin-Latour in particular. He was educated in New York at The Art Students League of New York on scholarships and the G.I. Bill.

== Biography ==
Born in Moose Lake, Minnesota, Pionk studied with Daniel Green and Sidney Dickinson at the Art Students League of New York. In 1984, he was named Master Pastelist by The Pastel Society of America and in 1997 was inducted into the Pastel Hall of Fame. He taught at the Art Students League and was President of the Salmagundi Club. Pionk garnered many awards for his work. He was best known for his still life, portraits and interior scenes in oil and pastel."

== Sample of work ==
Richard C. Pionk, "Grapes and Pears", Oil on Canvas

== Memberships ==
Richard C. Pionk held memberships with the following organizations:

- Salmagundi Club
- Art Students League
- Pastel Society of America - Trustee
- Allied Artists of America - Board of Directors
- Hudson Valley Art Association
- Knickerbocker Art Association
- Artist Fellowship – Trustee
- National Arts Club
- Audubon Artists – Trustee
- American Artists Professional League
- Dutch Treat Club

== Awards ==
- The Pastel Hall of Fame - 1997
- Master Pastelist by the Pastel Society of America - 1984

== Pastel ==
Pastel is an art medium in the form of a stick, consisting of pure powdered pigment and a binder. The pigments used in pastels are the same as those used to produce all colored art media, including oil paints; the binder is of a neutral hue and low saturation. The color effect of pastels is closer to the natural dry pigments than that of any other process.
