= Alexander Theobald Van Laer =

American painter

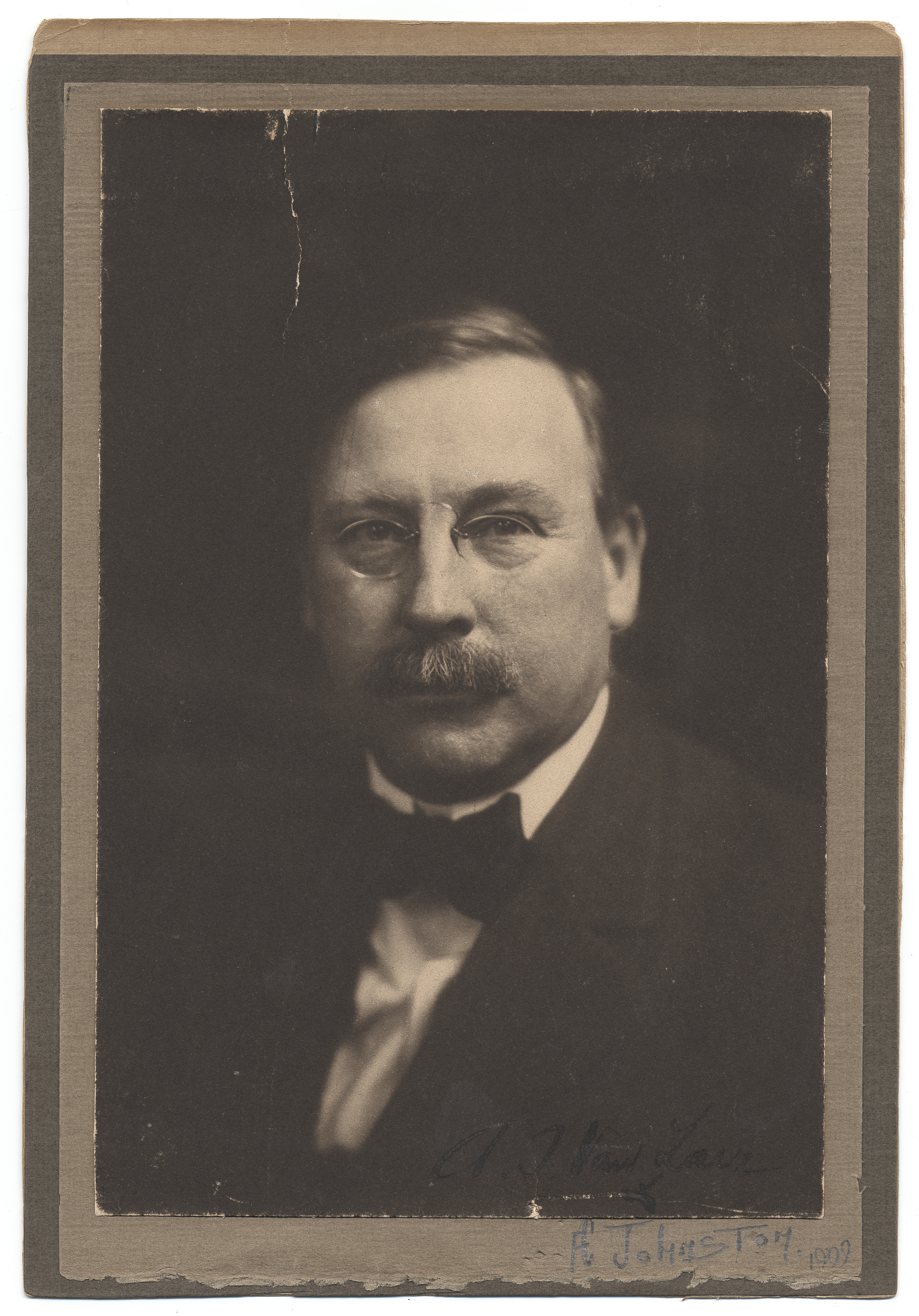
Alexander T. Van Laer in 1909

Alexander Theobald Van Laer (1857–1920) was an American painter, born in Auburn, New York.

== Early life and training ==
He studied at the Art Students League of New York, in the Netherlands under George Poggenbeek, and in the United States with Roger Swain Gifford.

== Work and style ==
He often exhibited with Adelaide Deming and Emily Vanderpoel. Van Laer was a member of the Salmagundi Club New York from 1892 until his death and three times served as its president, from 1897 to 1898, 1889 to 1900 and again from 1905 to 1908.

He taught for seven years at the Chautauqua Institute, and was a lecturer on art history at Smith College. He also lectured at the National Academy of Design, the Art Institute of Chicago and what is now the Brooklyn Museum. He primarily taught students in summer school settings and members of the public, rather than focusing on teaching in art schools where he would have gained disciples who would promote both his style and his reputation.

He won a bronze medal at the 1904 St. Louis Exhibition. A second source lists it as a gold medal. He served as president of the American Watercolor Society from 1910 to 1914.

Examples of his landscapes include:

- Winter Landscape (c. 1907)
- February Snow (Brooklyn Museum)
- Connecticut Hillside (National Gallery, Washington, D.C.)
- On the Brandywine (Herron Art Institute, Indianapolis)

When he died, American Art News characterized Van Laer as an "eminent American landscape painter" who was in "the front rank of modern American landscape painters." However, within several decades of his death, his work was forgotten, as the interest amongst artists and art experts turned to abstract works.

== Exhibitions/museum collections ==
Alexander Theobald Van Laer: The Lost Landscapes. The Mattatuck Museum. December 10, 1998 - February 14, 1999.
