= John Colquhoun =

John Colquhoun may refer to:

- Sir John Colquhoun, 2nd Baronet (c. 1622–1676), of the Colquhoun baronets
- Sir John Colquhoun, 1st Baronet (died c. 1650)
- John Colquhoun (minister) (1748–1827), Scottish minister
- John Campbell Colquhoun (1803–1870) British MP for Dunbartonshire, 1832–1835, Kilmarnock Burghs, 1837–1841, and Newcastle-under-Lyme, 1842–1847
- John Colquhoun (sportsman) (1805–1885), sportsman and Scots sportswriter
- John Frederick Colquhoun (1890–1968), World Scout Committee member
- John Colquhoun (footballer, born 1940) (1940–1996), Scottish football player, see List of Oldham Athletic A.F.C. players
- John Colquhoun (footballer) (born 1963), Scottish football player

== See also ==
- Colquhoun (surname)
