= Salmagundi Club =

Fine arts center in Manhattan, New York

- U.S. National Register of Historic Places
- New York State Register of Historic Places
- New York City Landmark
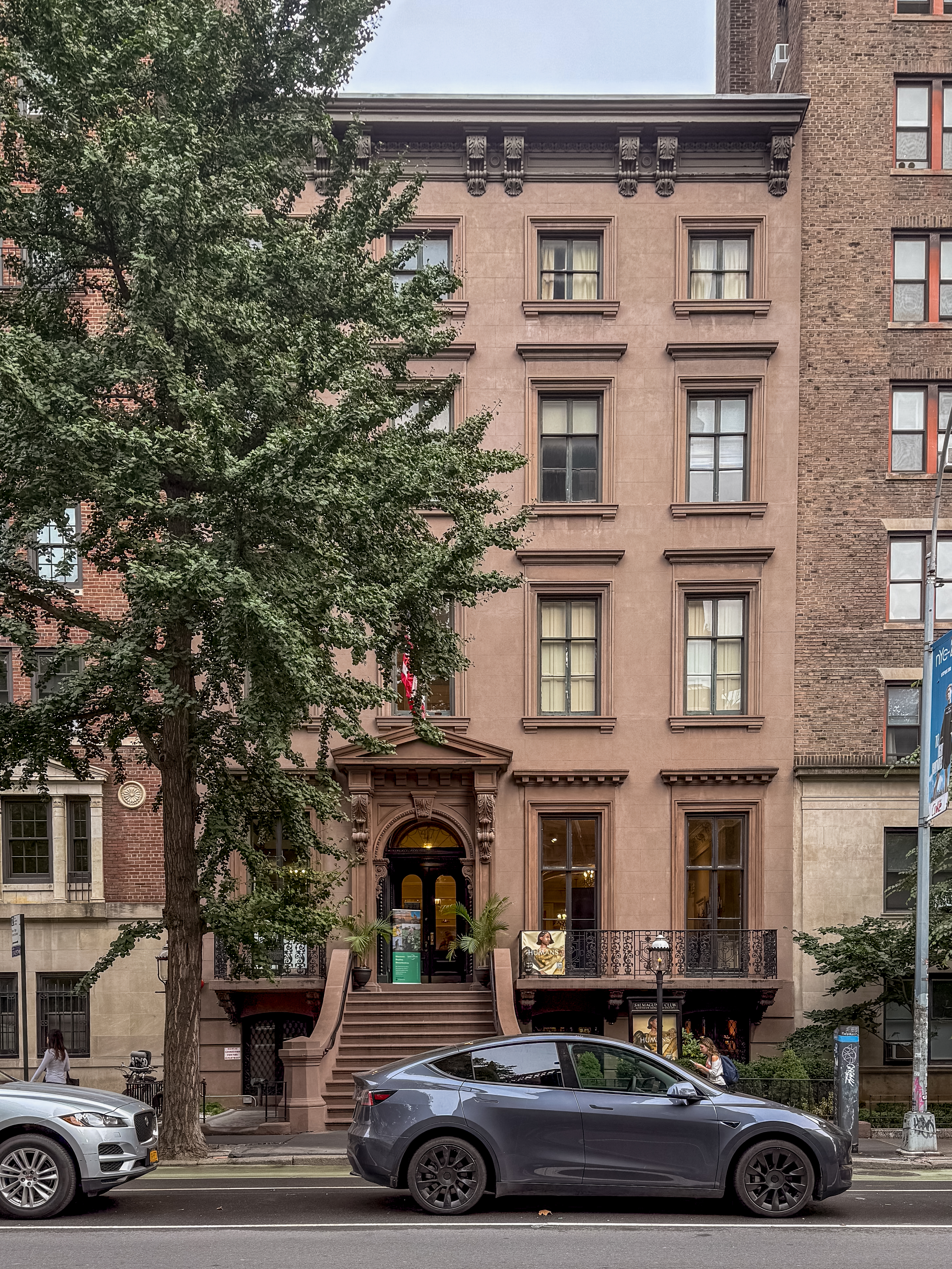
- (2024)

- Location within New York City Location within New York Location within the United States
- Location: 47 Fifth Avenue, New York, New York
- Coordinates: 40°44′3.4″N 73°59′40.5″W
- Built: 1853
- Architectural style: Italianate
- NRHP reference No.: 74001275
- NYSRHP No.: 06101.001763
- NYCL No.: 0009

Significant dates
- Added to NRHP: July 25, 1974
- Designated NYSRHP: November 22, 2004
- Designated NYCL: September 9, 1969

The Salmagundi Club, sometimes referred to as the Salmagundi Art Club, is a fine arts center founded in 1871 in the Greenwich Village section of Manhattan, New York City. Since 1917, it has been located at 47 Fifth Avenue. As of 2021, its membership roster totaled roughly 1,250 members.

The Salmagundi Club has served as a center for fine arts, artists and collectors, with art exhibitions, art classes, artist demonstrations, art auctions and many other types of events. It is also a sponsor of the United States Coast Guard Art Program (COGAP).

== History ==
It was founded in 1871. Originally called the New York Sketch Class, and later the New York Sketch Club, the Salmagundi Club had its beginnings at the eastern edge of Greenwich Village in sculptor Jonathan Scott Hartley's Broadway studio, where a group of artists, students, and friends at the National Academy of Design, which at the time was located at Fourth Avenue and Twenty-third Street, gathered weekly on Saturday evenings.

The club formally changed its name to The Salmagundi Sketch Club in January 1877. The name has variously been attributed to the Salmagundi Stew, which the group has long served, or to Washington Irving's Salmagundi Papers.

Growing rapidly, the organization was housed in a series of rented properties including 121 Fifth Avenue, 49 West 22nd Street, 40 West 22nd Street and finally 14 West Twelfth Street, where it remained for 22 years. In April 1917, following a three-year search, the club purchased Irad and Sarah Hawley's 1853 Italianate-style brownstone townhouse at 47 Fifth Avenue between East Eleventh and East Twelfth Streets from the estate of William G. Park for $75,000.00 and erected a two-story annex in the rear at an additional cost of $20,000.00 to house its primary art gallery and a billiard room. A housewarming event on February 5, 1918, was attended by more than 500 persons. In 1918, the club spearheaded a national effort to produce range-finder paintings used to train military gunners for World War I. The club provided the canvas and painting materials for these special-purpose paintings.

In 1969 the building was designated a city landmark by the New York City Landmarks Preservation Commission. In 1975 it was added to the National Register of Historic Places.

== Membership ==
The Salmagundi Club was a male-only club for its first century, although artworks by women were accepted and praised. A sister club for women artists, the Pen and Brush Club, was formed around the corner from Salmagundi in 1894. Salmagundi began admitting women members in 1973.

Members of the Salmagundi Club have included Tore Asplund, Thomas P. Barnett, William Richardson Belknap, Alon Bement, Ralph Blakelock, A. J. Bogdanove, Charles Bosseron Chambers, James Wells Champney, William Merritt Chase, C.K. Chatterton, Frederick Stuart Church, Jay Hall Connaway, Francis S. Dixon, John Henry Dolph, Charles Dana Gibson, William W. Gilchrist Jr., Gordon H. Grant, Walter Granville-Smith, Edmund Greacen, Charles P. Gruppé, Emile Gruppe, William Hart, Childe Hassam, Ernest Martin Hennings, Harry Hoffman, Alexander Pope Humphrey, George Inness Jr., Lajos "Louis" Jambor, John LaFarge, David Wu Ject-key, Ernest Lawson, Austin W. Lord, Frank Mason, Leopold Matzal, Samizu Matsuki, John Francis Murphy, Spencer Baird Nichols, Richard C. Pionk, Howard Pyle, Will J. Quinlan, Norman Rockwell, Harry Roseland, Augustus Saint-Gaudens, R. F. Schabelitz, Leopold Seyffert, Channel Pickering Townsley, Louis Comfort Tiffany, Edward Charles Volkert, Ernest William Watson, J. Alden Weir, Jack Wemp, Stanford White, William Wilson (physicist), Stuart Williamson, Joseph Mortimer Lichtenauer and N.C. Wyeth.

Honorary members have included Paul Cadmus, Schuyler Chapin, Winston Churchill, Buckminster Fuller, Al Hirschfeld, and Thomas Hoving.

In 1894, to raise money for the growing club's library, artist members were invited to decorate ceramic mugs, which were then fired by Charles Volkmar, the club potter. The club would host a dinner followed by an auction of the finished mugs ... Over the years, many decorated mugs have been returned to the club and are on exhibit in the library along with the largest collection of used artists' palettes in America.

— Dubuque Museum of Art

Salmagundi curatorial committee is responsible for maintaining Salmagundi's permanent representational art collection of approximately 1,800 works from the 1840s to today, including: paintings, sculpture, objects and works on paper by its past and present artist members.

The collection consists of exhibition purchase prizes, competition purchase prizes, artist donations, and estate bequests.

The works are rotated on a continual basis throughout the townhouse and are featured in live shows and online exhibitions throughout the year.

Past Chairs of the Board have been

- Joseph Hartley, 1871–1889
- George W. Maynard, 1888–1889
- Charles Yardley Turner, 1883–1889
- Thomas Moran, 1893–1896
- W. Lewis Fraser, 1896–1897
- Alexander Theobald Van Laer, 1897–1898
- Robert C. Minor, 1898–1899
- Alexander Theobald Van Laer, 1899–1900
- George H. McCord, 1900–1901
- George Inness Jr., 1901–1903
- J. Scott Hartley, 1903–1905
- Alexander Theobald Van Laer, 1905–1908
- Henry B. Snell, 1908–1910
- Frank Knox Morton Rehn, 1910–1911
- Carleton Wiggins, 1911–1913
- Charles Vezin, 1913–1914
- F. Ballard Williams, 1914–1919
- Emil Carlsen, 1919–1920
- J. Massey Rhind, 1920–1922
- Hobart Nichols, 1922–1924
- W. Granville-Smith, 1924–1926
- Franklin De Haven, 1926–1929
- Bruce Crane, 1929–1933
- Louis Betts, 1933–1935
- George Elmer Brown, 1935–1937
- Frederick W. Hutchinson, 1937–1939
- Gordon Grant, 1939–1941
- George Lober, 1941–1944
- Frederick K. Detwiller, 1944–1946
- Henry O' Connor, 1946–1947
- Silvio B. Valerio, 1947–1949
- Percy Albee, 1949–1953
- Russell Rypsam, 1953–1955
- Henry Laussucq, 1955–1957
- Junius Allen, 1957–1959
- A. Henry Nordhausen, 1959–1963
- Francis Vandeveer Kughler, 1963–1966
- Martin Hannon, 1966–1970
- John N. Lewis, 1970–1976
- Martin Hannon, 1976–1977
- Raymond R. Goldberg, 1977–1979
- Richard Clive, 1979–1981
- Carl L. Thomson, 1981–1983
- Ruth B. Reininghaus, 1983–1987
- Edward A. Brennan, 1987–1990
- Kenneth W. Fitch, 1990–1991
- Robert Volpe, 1991–1994
- Richard C. Pionk, 1994–2007
- Claudia Seymour, 2007–2013
- Robert Pillsbury, 2013–2019
- Elizabeth Spencer, 2019–2021
- Jacob Collins, 2021 - 2024
- Aurelio ("Ray") Cisneros, 2024
- George Grubb, 2024 -
