= Francis S. Dixon =

American Impressionist painter

Francis Stillwell Dixon (September 18, 1879 – January 6, 1967) was an American Impressionist painter known for landscapes and seascape paintings.

== Early life and education ==
Dixon was born in Queens, Long Island. He had nine siblings and was named after his mother, Frances Stillwell. Dixon's grandfather was a United States Senator from Connecticut from 1857 to 1869. His father was a Civil War officer and journalist.

He honed his skills as a painter at the Art Students League in New York.

== Career ==
During World War I, Dixon was a singer for the War Department in New York City. He was a member of the Society of Colonial Wars, the Sons of the Revolution, Allied Artists of America (NY), Connecticut Academy of Fine Arts, the Players and the Dutch Treat Club and the Salmagundi Club, where he performed for years. In the 1920s, Dixon traveled to Bermuda, England and Europe painting local scenes before settling in Manhattan in the thirties.

While in California between 1915 and 1917, Dixon stayed in Carmel and Point Lobos, the latter being where he painted The Leaning Tree, which was included in Elizabeth M. Kornhauser’s, American Paintings before 1945 and is a part of a permanent collection at the Wadsworth Atheneum Museum of Art in Hartford, Connecticut.

== Personal life ==
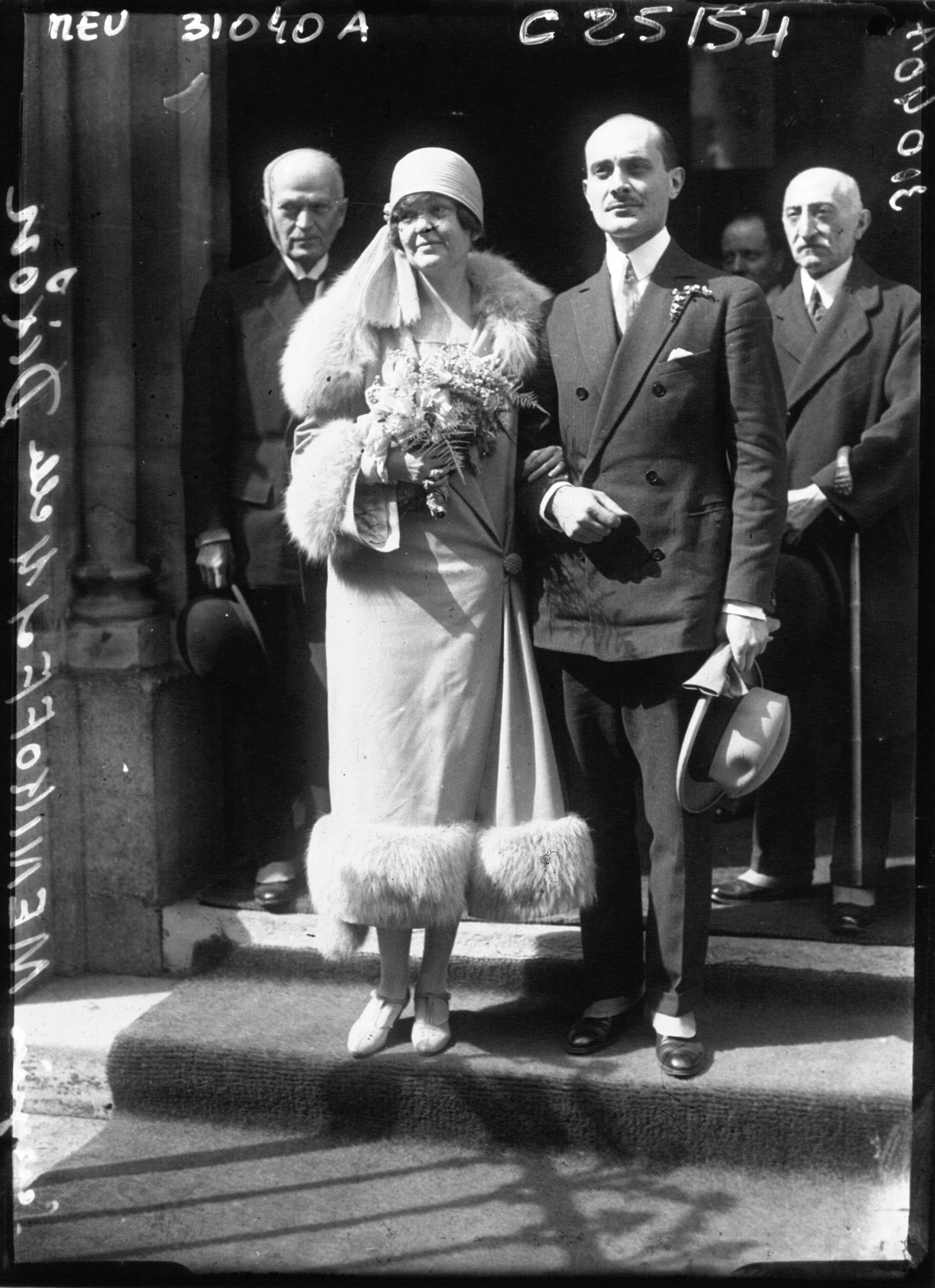
Wedding of Dixon's ex-wife Rosalie Turner Hooker with Prince Melikov in 1926.

Dixon's first wife was Rosalie Turner Hooker. They married in Salinas, California on August 10, 1915. Dixon had been the best man at Hooker's first wedding, which was to Dixon's cousin, William C. Welling. Dixon and Hooker had a son, Francis Stillwell Dixon Jr., but divorced in Paris in 1925 on the grounds of abandonment. A year later Rosalie married Prince Leva Melikov de Somhitie whose family once ruled Georgia in Russia. Dixon married Emilie A. Mcmillan in 1929.

On February 5, 1938, Dixon's son married Renee Barat Fannon. They had a child, Kent H. Dixon, and lived as socialites on Sunset Island Three in Miami.

== Death and legacy ==
Dixon died at home in New York City, in 1967, at the age of 87.

In 1996, Kent Dixon loaned 43 of his grandfather's tonal oil paintings to the Springfield Museum of Art for a six-week show. In 2006, he had a record sale of US$22,800 at Shannon's auction for one of his oil on canvas paintings, A Summer Sail.

== Selected collections ==
- Wadsworth Athenaeum, Hartford, Connecticut
- Morgan Memorial, Hartford, Connecticut

== Selected exhibitions ==
- Springfield Museum of Art, Ohio, 1996
- Mint Museum of Art, North Carolina, 1948
- Number 10 Gallery, New York, 1941 (solo)
- Allied Artists of America, New York, 1940
- Barbizon-Plaza Galleries, New York, 1939
- Studio Guild Galleries, New York, 1937
- Women's University Club, New York, 1937 (solo)
- Babcock Galleries, New York, 1926, 1927 (solo)
- National Academy of Design, New York, 1925
- Salmagundi Club, New York, 1917-1940, 1943, 1945, 1956
- Society of Independent Artists, New York, 1917-18, 1920-22, 1924
- Folson Gallery, New York, 1917 (solo)
- The Corcoran Gallery of Art, Washington, DC, 1916

== Selected works ==
- The Leaning Tree
- Impressionist spring landscape
- Impressionist landscape
- New England winter landscape
- Landscape
- Waves crashing on a rocky coast
- Winter
- Winter Landscapes
- Town nestled under snow-capped mountains
- A Summer Sail
- Two Autumn Landscapes
- Near Farmington, Conn.
- Green Spring
- Evening
- Moonpath
