= Dutch Treat Club =

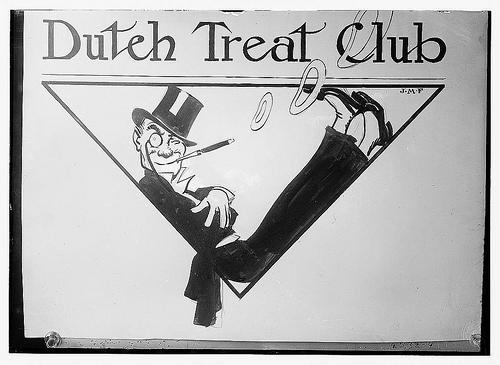

The Dutch Treat Club is a society of illustrators, writers and performers based in New York City, United States. Primarily social in nature, the club has had as members such leading literary figures and humorists as Robert Benchley, Rube Goldberg, Robert M. McBride, and Ogden Nash.

== Founding ==
In 1905, Tuesday was the day of the week when Life Magazine's editors, such as J. A. Mitchell reviewed the drawings and writings of their regular contributors.

Every Tuesday morning Life's anteroom would be thronged with clever illustrators chatting together sociably as they waited their turns to be ushered into the sanctum of "JAM", and writers waiting similarly for interviews with Thomas L. Masson, the literary editor. Since many of these contributors lived in the suburbs, it was natural that, being in town for the day, they should feel like having a good time in each other's company. And so the "gang" got the habit of lunching somewhere together, each paying for his own meal.

Life contributors brought friends who had no connection with that magazine. Numbers grew till one Tuesday the bunch organized themselves officially as the Dutch Treat Club, with Masson as President.

The eleven founders included four writers, four illustrators, two editors and a publisher, among them:

- James Montgomery Flagg, illustrator later famous for his Uncle Sam
- Rupert Hughes
- Julian Street
- Ellis Parker Butler
- Frank Ward O'Malley
- Will Irwin
- Wallace Irwin
- George Barry Mallon, then city editor of the New York newspaper The Sun.

== Past members ==
- Richard C. Pionk
- Eric Sloane
- Lowell Thomas
- Isaac Asimov
- Clarence Budington Kelland
- R.M. Brinkerhoff

Steven Dohanos, illustrator, Saturday Evening Post 1940-50
