= Franklin De Haven =

American painter

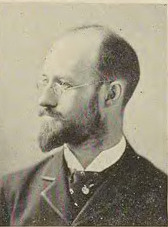
- Born: 26 December 1856
- Died: 10 January 1934 (aged 77)

Franklin De Haven (December 26, 1856 – January 10, 1934) was an American painter.

He was born in Bluffton, Indiana. He married Elizabeth Woodcock of Jersey City in 1902. His paintings received awards including the Inness Prize in 1902, from the Salmagundi Club; Silver Medal from the National Arts Club in 1921; and the Brown-Bigelow Gold Medal from the Allied Artists of America in 1930, for his painting "Nocturne". He was president of the Salmagundi Club from 1926 to 1927. He died in Presbyterian Hospital in New York after his right foot was amputated because of an infection.
