= Robert Colquhoun (disambiguation) =

Robert Colquhoun (1914–1962) was a Scottish painter, printmaker and theatre set designer.

Robert Colquhoun may also refer to:

- Robert Colquhoun (14th century), of Clan Colquhoun; chief of Colquhoun and Luss
- Robert Colquhoun (East India Company officer) (1786–1838), organizer of the Kemaoon Battalion during the Gurkha War
- Robert Gilmour Colquhoun (1803–1870), British diplomat
- Robert Colquhoun (bowls) (1882–?), English bowls player
