= David Wu Ject-key =

Chinese-American painter (1890–1968)

- Born: 1 October 1890; Zhongshan, China
- Died: 17 April 1968 (aged 77); Boston
- Education: The Grand Central School of Art
- Known for: Oil painting
- Notable work: Desolation, General Officer
- Movement: Realism
- Partner: Elsebeth Kjaersgaard

David Wu Ject-key
- Traditional Chinese: 伍澤樞
- Simplified Chinese: 伍泽枢
Transcriptions

David Wu Ject-key (Chinese: 伍澤樞; 1890 – 16 April 1968) was a Chinese-American painter born in Zhongshan, Guangdong province.

== Legacy ==
A number of awards have been named after David and Elsie, including The Elsie & David Wu Ject-Key Memorial Award at the 152nd Annual International Exhibition of the American Watercolor Society, The D.Wu / Elsie Ject-Key & Marion de Sola Mendes Memorial Award for Drawing of the National Association of Women Artists, Inc, The Elsie-Ject Key Award of the National Society of Painters in Acrylic, and The D.Wu & Elsie Ject-Key Memorial Award of the Salmagundi Club in New York City.

== Personal life ==
David Wu was married to Danish painter Elsie Kjaersgaard.

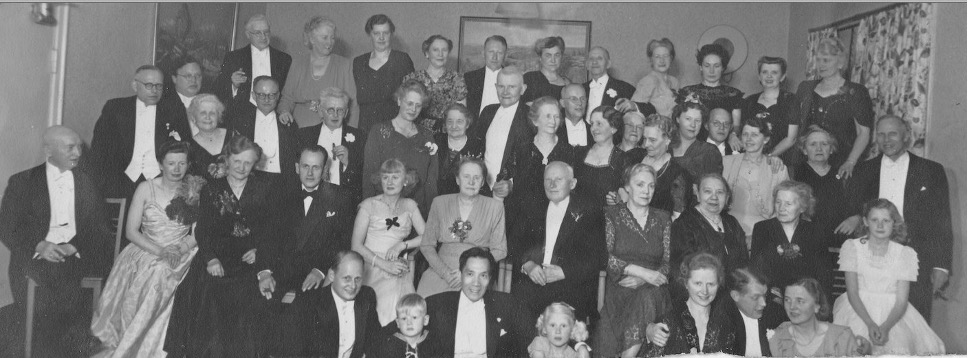
David Wu in the middle of front row

At the time of David Wu’s death, Elsie asked a friend and member of the Chung Shan Association, a group that David had helped form many years earlier: “Is this cemetery only for the men of the Chung Shan Association?” The reply: “It is a cemetery for Chinese people, and you are one of us.”
