= Sidney Dickinson =

American painter (1890–1980)

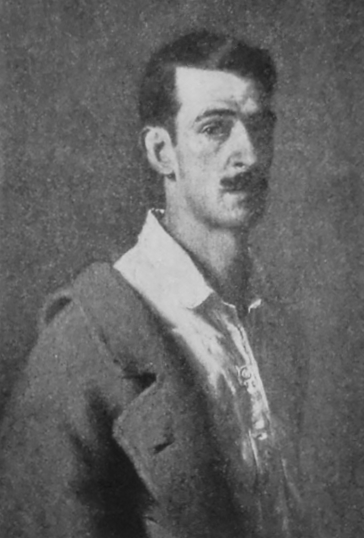
Self-portrait, c. 1916

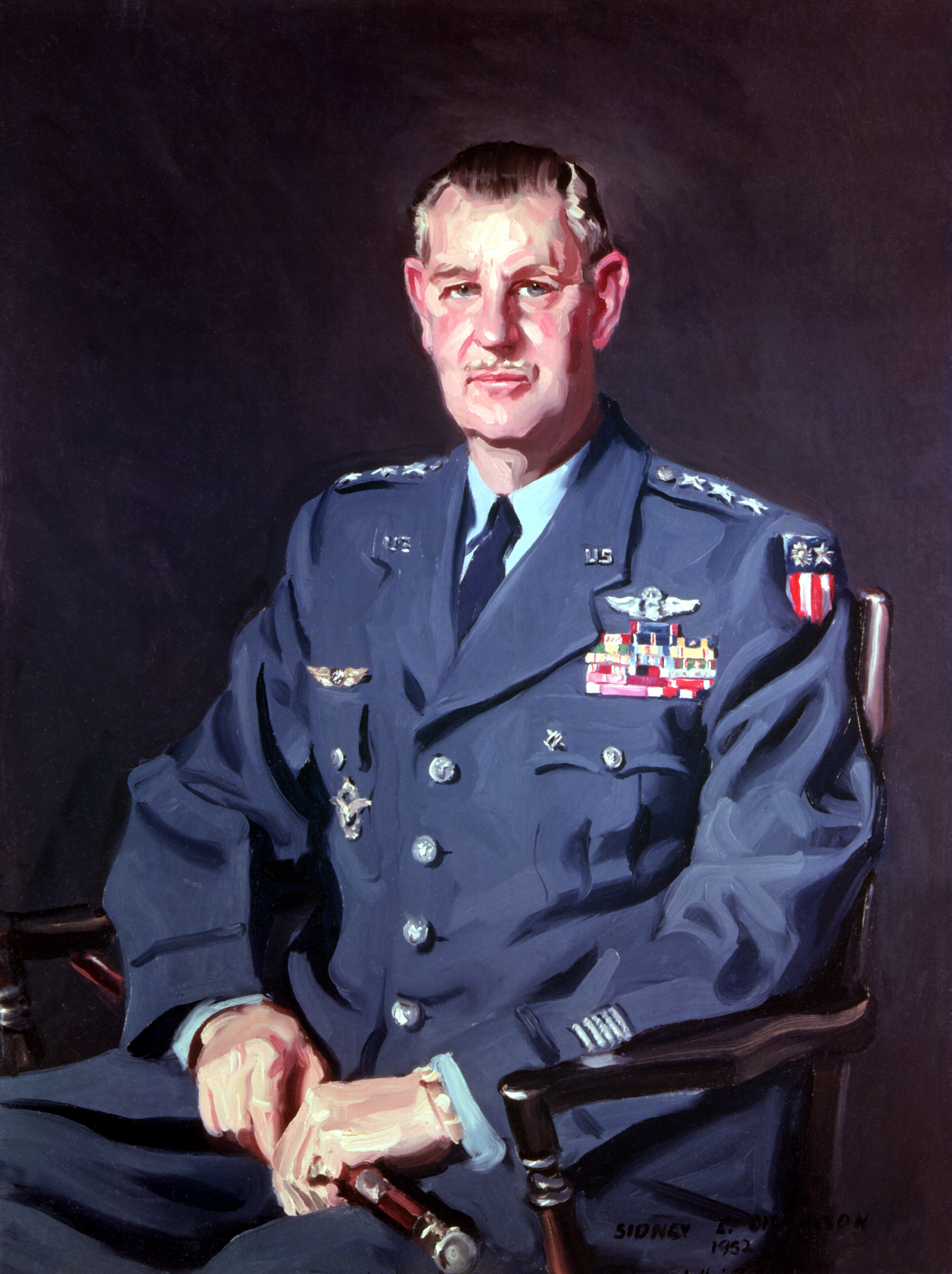
Portrait of George E. Stratemeyer, oil on canvas, currently owned by the United States Department of Defense

Sidney (sometimes Sydney) Edward Dickinson (November 28, 1890 – April 11, 1980) was an American painter.

== Biography ==
Dickinson was born in Wallingford, Connecticut, and was the son of a Congregationalist minister, Charles H. Dickinson. His parents moved frequently; from 1894 to 1901 the family lived in Canandaigua, New York, and they spent time in Fargo, North Dakota and Calhoun, Alabama, where they assisted his aunt, Charlotte Thorn, in the running of the Calhoun Colored School.

Dickinson studied with George Bridgman and William Merritt Chase at the Art Students League of New York from 1910 to 1911, and from 1910 to 1912 he was a pupil of Douglas Volk at the school of the National Academy of Design. He spent time traveling around the country doing manual labor, working in lumber camps and finding employment as a surveyor's roadman and farmhand.

Dickinson first exhibited with the National Academy in 1915, hanging a self-portrait at that year's winter show. He received a Julius Hallgarten Prize on the occasion of his third show with the organization, in 1917, and continued to exhibit there for nearly fifty years. He earned another Hallgarten Prize in 1924; the Isaac N. Maynard Prize in 1933 and 1938; the Benjamin Altman Prize in 1936; and the Andrew Carnegie Prize in 1942. He served on the Academy Council from 1930 until 1933. He was elected a member of the American Academy of Arts and Letters in 1931.

Dickinson was active as an instructor for many years, teaching at the Art Students League in 1919–1920 and heading a life class at the National Academy from 1928 to 1931 and again from 1939 to 1943. In the summers of 1943 and 1944 he returned to the League to teach, and became a regular faculty member there in 1949, retiring in 1973. Pupils included Albert Wasserman, James Rosenquist, Richard Pionk, and Robert Neffson.

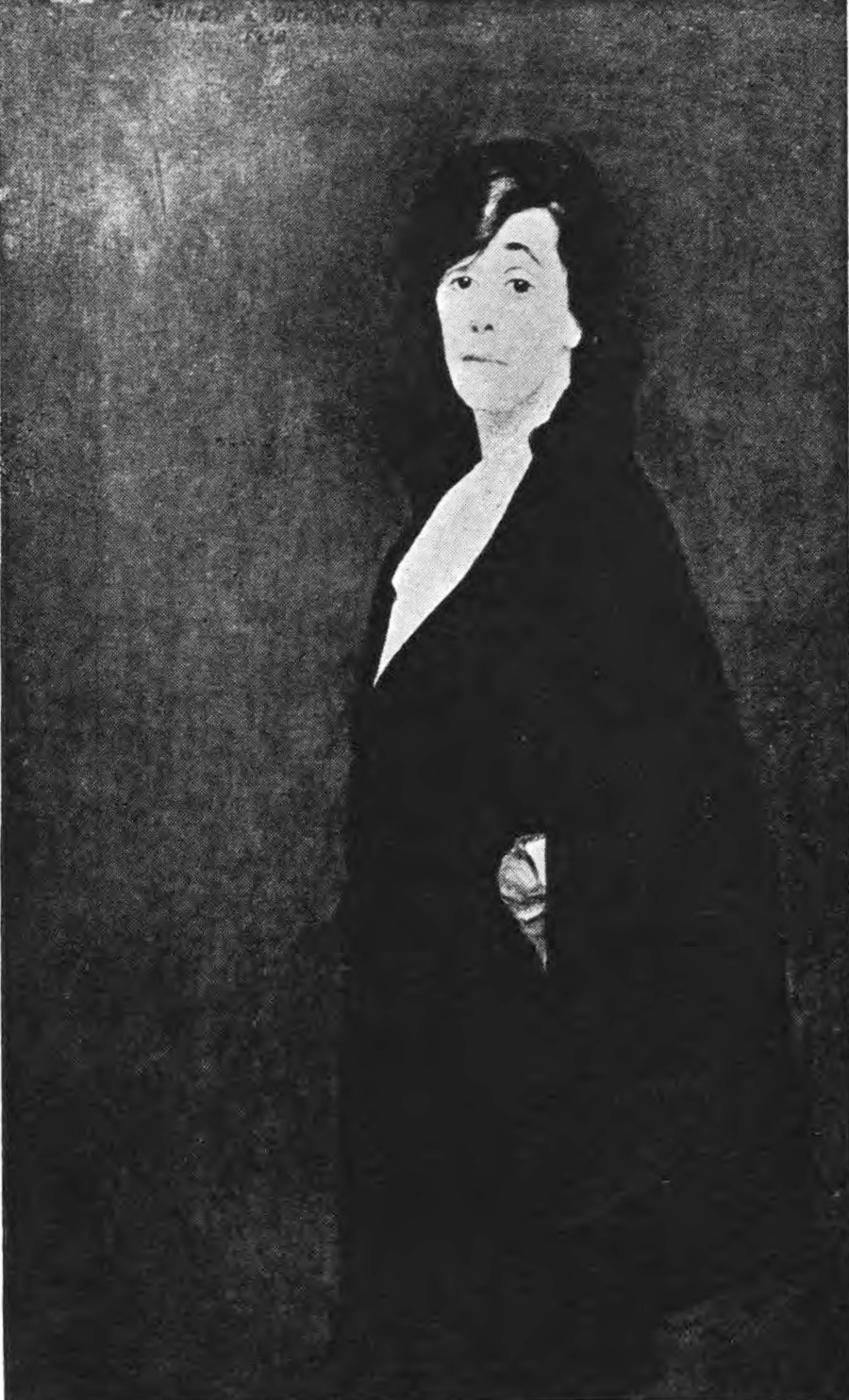
The Black Cape, Sidney E. Dickinson (b&w reproduction)

Dickinson was a prolific portraitist; among the artists whose portraits he showed at the Academy are Paul Arndt, Robert Aitken, Louis Bosa, Eugene Higgins, Hobart Nichols, Raphael Soyer, and his second cousin Edwin Dickinson. He also produced notable portraits of members of the Rockefeller family, the official mayoral portrait of Fiorello LaGuardia, and Governor Thomas E. Kilby of Alabama. A self-portrait by Dickinson is part of the National Academy's permanent collection, along with portraits of Mary Gray, George Wharton Edwards, Harry Wilson Watrous, Georg J. Lober, Frederick K. Detwiller, Donald De Lue, Ernest Nathaniel Townsend, John Wesley Carroll, Theodore E. Blake, Otto R. Eggers, Robert S. Hutchins, Bryant Baker, and Edgar I. Williams.

Other works by Dickinson are held in the collections of the Figge Art Museum, Harvard University, Princeton University, the United States Department of State, and the University of Iowa. Dickinson also painted many figurative works throughout his career; a number of these were born of his experiences in Alabama, and are owned by the Greenville County Museum of Art in South Carolina.

He was noted for working in wet-on-wet style, and composed many of his works directly in the studio, often completing a portrait during a single three- or four-hour sitting. Dickinson kept a studio in Carnegie Hall until retiring to Windsor, Vermont, where he would die on April 11, 1980.

His children were wildlife biologist Nate Dickinson and mechanical engineer Thorn Watson Dickinson. Dickinson's grandson Charles Dickinson is also a painter.

== Lee Portrait ==
Dickinson painted a 69x47" portrait of General Robert E. Lee in 1951. It is owned by the United States Military Academy. The painting depicts Lee in his grey uniform with gold piping as a general of the Confederate army. In the background, a Black man leads a horse that likely belongs to Lee. On January 19, 1952, the portrait was unveiled in the Main Room of the West Point Library.

The Academy had pointedly refused to display Lee in his rebel's uniform. The United Daughters of the Confederacy first suggested a rebel portrait of Lee in 1930. West Point compromised by accepting a portrait of him in the blue uniform he wore as Superintendent of the academy. For the academy's sesquicentennial, Gordon Gray proposed the idea of a portrait that featured Lee at the height of his fame. He led the committee which selected Dickinson as the artist. The installation of a painting featuring an insurrectionist's garb was meant to "symbolize the end of sectional differences in our country". It was displayed opposite an 1866 portrait of Ulysses S. Grant.

In 2021, the United States Congress created a Naming Commission in its annual budget for the Department of Defense. Its job was to create a list of military assets associated with the Confederate States of America and recommendations for their removal. Because Lee was "responsible for the deaths of more United States soldiers than practically any other enemy in our nation's history", the commission unanimously recommended his portrait be removed or relocated from the library. In December 2022, West Point started removing Confederate symbols, including Lee's portrait which was placed in storage. In August 2025, the Department of Defense announced its intention to display Dickinson's portrait again, in defiance of the law.
