= Jack Wemp =

American painter

- During service in Royal Regiment of Canadian Artillery, 1945
- Born: Bruce Robert Wemp; 29 November 1925; Seattle, Washington
- Died: 13 November 2005 (aged 79); Toms River, New Jersey
- Education: Art Center College of Design, Los Angeles, California
- Known for: Painting, Drawing
- Movement: Expressionism, Realism

Jack Richard Wemp (November 29, 1925 – November 13, 2005) was an American artist whose painting styles spanned the Depression era, expressionism, 1960’s contemporary art styles, and, for the last 30 years of his life, a realist style reminiscent of the Hudson River School.

== Early life ==
Born in Seattle, Washington in 1925. At the beginning of the Great Depression, his father moved the family to Vancouver, British Columbia, Canada. Encouraged by his artistically talented parents, Jack began to draw and paint at an early age and art was always his favorite school subject. In high school, he had the benefit of having a very talented and professional artist for an instructor. However, as much as an art career appealed to Jack, it seemed at the time, that a more stable career should be pursued. During his high school summer vacations, he worked as a cowhand on the vast Half-Diamond-One cattle ranch west of Calgary. This experience led him to the agricultural college of the University of Alberta, but after six months he volunteered for service in the Royal Regiment of Canadian Artillery and went overseas to England. When World War II ended, Jack was appointed as a staff artist by his commanding officer and this experience reinforced his desire to pursue art as a career. Jack is a graduate of Olds School of Agriculture in Olds, Alberta, Canada. He studied art and advertising at the Provincial Institute of Technology and Arts in Calgary, Alberta, Canada, the California School of Art in Los Angeles and the Art Center School (Art Center College of Design) in Los Angeles where he studied under Ed Reep.

== Commercial art ==
After working for Keystone press and Cockfield, Brown & Co in Vancouver, British Columbia, Canada, he moved to New York City where he began work as an illustrator for Sales Graphics, a large Mid-town studio and later became the studio's art director. After three years, he opened his own studio Wemp & Williamson and later, Jack Wemp Inc. During this time he produced illustrations, graphics, film and full scale national sales shows for such notable clients as Breck Shampoo, Johnson & Johnson and American Cyanamid. Wemp employed the services of such notables as artists Sam Kweskin, Stan Learner and writer John Bishop. With the recession of the '70's and cutbacks in large sales shows, Wemp moved from his Westchester home to Northern Dutchess County, where he could further phase out from the Madison Avenue scene. Here Jack opened his Artists Studio in Rhinebeck, New York where he briefly dabbled in ceramics. He soon took on the position as art director and production manager for Taconic Press Newspapers from 1975–1977.

== Fine artist ==
Cover Painting by Jack Wemp

Although Jack produced dozens of paintings throughout his early days and commercial career, in 1977, he all but gave up his commercial art business to begin painting full-time. A keen interest in 19th century sailing ships and farming helped to shape the subject and style of his paintings. Earlier work exhibited his expressionist style in his landscape art and seascapes. Into the 80’s as his representational style developed, his vibrancy was evident in his tumultuous seas and magnificent skies. Always a stickler for detail, his attention to perspective and shadow were second to none. Often Wemp built models for his work to capture subtle shadings. His work always had a place in the seasons and a story behind it. Much of his work exhibited a heart and arrow with JW loves PW inscribed within. This symbol would be discreetly illustrated as a carving in a tree, building or furniture and was a testimony of his love for his wife of nearly 60 years, Peggy.

== Recognition ==
- His work graces the cover of John Devoy's Catalpa Expedition (Catalpa rescue) (ISBN 0-8147-2748-4)
- Received The American Artists Professional League Award for Representational Art in 2004 and 2005
- Was a member and received an award from the Salmagundi Art Club in NYC.
- Member of The Hudson Valley Art Association under which he sold pieces and received awards.
- Work exhibited extensively at Mystic Seaport Gallery and The Annapolis Marine Art Gallery.
- Wemp was chosen out of dozens of artists to paint the mural for The Northern Dutchess Hospital in Rhinebeck, New York.
- Numerous consignment pieces grace many homes and businesses across the country and one found a suitable home on the cruise ship MS Prinsendam (1988).
- Rendition of Wemp's ancestor's barn The Greater Wemp Barn (built by Jan Wemp in the 18th century and recently purchased, moved and restored by Carl Touhey in Fuera Bush NY is available through the non-profit organization, The Dutch Barn Preservation Society as a print.
- Wemp's estate continues an exclusive publishing deal with Art Licensing
