= Clan Colquhoun =

Scottish clan

- Clann a' Chombaich
- Crest: A hart's head couped Gules, attired Argent.
- Motto: Si je puis. (Engl. If I can)
- War cry: Cnoc Ealachain! (Engl. Hill of the Black Willow)

Profile
- Region: Highlands
- District: Dunbartonshire
- Plant badge: Hazel saplings.
- Pipe music: The Colquhoun's March

Chief
- Sir Malcolm Rory Colquhoun of Luss,
- 8th Baronet and Chief of Clan Colquhoun.
- Seat: Rossdhu House.
- Historic seat: Dunglass Castle
Septs of Clan Colquhoun
Calhoun, Cowan, Ingram, Kilpatrick, King, Kirkpatrick, Lang, Laing, McCowan, McMain, McManus, McLintock, McOwan.
Allied clans
Clan Grant
Rival clans
Clan MacGregor
Clan MacFarlane

Clan Colquhoun (Scottish Gaelic: Clann a' Chombaich [ˈkʰl̪ˠãũn̪ˠ ə ˈxɔ̃ũmpɪç]) is a Highland Scottish clan.

== History ==
Colquhoun tartan

=== Origins of the clan ===
The lands of the clan Colquhoun are on the shores of Loch Lomond. During the reign of Alexander II, Umphredus de Kilpatrick received from Malduin, Earl of Lennox, the estates of Colquhoun, Auchentorily and Dumbuck. The clan chief's early stronghold was at Dunglass Castle, which is perched on a rocky promontory by the River Clyde. Dunglass was also close to the royal Dumbarton Castle, of which later Colquhoun chiefs were appointed governors and keepers.

The chief's title was that of the Barony of Luss which came to the clan when Sir Robert of Colquhoun married the heiress of the Lord of Luss in about 1368.

=== 15th and 16th centuries ===
During the minority of James II of Scotland, Sir John Colquhoun was appointed governor of the royal Dumbarton Castle. However he was murdered during a raid at Inchmurrin in 1439. He was succeeded by his son, another Sir John, who rose to be Comptroller of the Royal Household. He received a charter incorporating all of his lands into the free barony of Luss in 1457. A year later he also received the forests of Rossdhu and Glenmachome together with the lands of Kilmardinny.

In 1474 Sir John Colquhoun was part of an embassy to Edward IV of England which was to negotiate the marriage between Edward's daughter, Cecilia and the infant James IV of Scotland. Sir John fought at the siege of Dunbar Castle which was being held by rebels and there he was killed by a cannonball.

The clan Colqhuhoun also controlled Camstradden Castle that had been acquired by a younger son of Luss in 1395. The sixth Colquhoun Laird of Camstradden was a renowned knight and in 1547 fought at the Battle of Pinkie Cleugh.

=== 17th century ===
Colquhoun lands were particularly vulnerable to raids due to their strategic nature. In 1603 Alasdair MacGregor marched into Colquhoun territory with a force of over four hundred MacGregor clansmen. The chief of clan Colquhoun had been granted a royal commission to suppress the MacGregors. He assembled a force of five hundred foot and three hundred horse and advanced to Glen Fruin to repel the Highland raiders. MacGregor split his force in two and while the main force and the Colquhouns engaged in combat the second MacGregor force attacked from the rear. The Colquhouns were driven into the Moss of Auchingaich where their cavalry was useless and over two hundred men were killed. At the end of the 18th century, the chiefs of the two clans met and shook hands on the very site of the former slaughter.

In 1625 Sir John Colquhoun of Luss was created a baronet in the Baronetage of Nova Scotia. However, in 1632 he was accused of absconding with his wife's sister, Lady Catherine Graham, daughter of the Earl of Montrose. He was accused of using sorcery and witchcraft and perhaps wisely he did not return to answer these charges. He became a fugitive and his estates were forfeited. Sir John's eldest son recovered the estates in 1646.

=== 18th century ===
In 1703 Sir Humphrey Colquhoun, fifth Baronet, represented Dunbartonshire in the last Scottish Parliament. He strongly opposed the Treaty of Union. He died without male issue and the title passed to his daughter's husband, James Grant of Pluscardine. However, when Pluscardine's elder brother died he re-assumed the name of Grant. He was the ancestor of the Earls of Seafield and Barons Strathspey, on whom the baronetcy devolved. The estate was succeeded to by Sir James Grant Colquhoun who was the fourth son of James Grant and Ann Colquhoun. He built the mansion of Rossdhu which remains the seat of the Colquhoun chiefs.

== Clan Colquhoun today ==
Sir Ivar Colquhoun, 30th Laird of Luss and 32nd Chief of Colquhoun succeeded as chief of the clan in 1948. He was the longest serving chief of the clan having served for almost 60 years until his death in 2008. Upon his death he was succeeded by his surviving son Malcolm.

Sir Malcolm is married to Katharine, Lady Colquhoun. His heir-apparent, Patrick Colquhoun, Younger of Luss, was born of his first wife Susan Timmerman. Altogether there are three children. Sir Malcolm chairs the Luss Estates. In 2012, they opened the Loch Lomond Arms Hotel in Luss.

=== Clan septs ===
The Clan Colquhoun International Society, the official organization representing the clan considers the following names as septs of clan Colquhoun. However several of the names are claimed by other clans, including clan Gregor – traditional enemy of clan Colquhoun.

- Calhoun, Cahoon, Cahoone, Cohoon, Colhoun, Cowan, Cowen, Cowing, Ingram (or Ingraham), Kilpatrick, King, Kirkpatrick, Laing (or Lang), McCowan, McMains (or McMain), McManus, McClintock and McOwan, Covian, McCovian.

== See also ==
- Cahoon, a variant name
- Colhoun (disambiguation), a variant name
- Colquhoun, A surname of Clan Colquhoun
