= Will J. Quinlan =

Will J. Quinlan (William James Quinlan, 3rd, 1877–1963), artist, was born in Brooklyn on June 27, 1877. He lost his hearing as a child. He had an early interest in art and attended the National Academy of Design, Pratt Institute and Adelphi Academy in Brooklyn. He was an accomplished etcher, primarily of architectural city scenes, and also painted with oils. He was awarded the Black & White Prize in 1913 and the Shaw Etching Prize, all from the Salmagundi Club in New York City for two successive years, 1913 and 1914.

Quinlan's works can be found in the permanent collections of the New York Public Library, the New York Historical Society, the Oakland Museum in California, the Hudson River Museum in Yonkers, New York, and the John H. Vanderpoel Art Gallery of Chicago. Two of his oil paintings, on loan from the Hudson River Museum, are displayed at Yonkers City Hall. The New York Historical Society has an extensive selection of his New York City etchings in its Print Collection.

Quinlan died in Seattle, Washington on April 21, 1963.
