= Calhoun Hollow =

Valley in Missouri, United States

Coordinates: 38.8747644°N 91.4929411°W

Calhoun Hollow is a valley in Montgomery County, Missouri, United States.

Calhoun Hollow has the name of John Calhoun, original owner of the site.
