= Margaret Colquhoun =

Evolutionary biologist

Dr Margaret Colquhoun (née Kelsey)
- Born: 10 May 1947; Yorkshire, England
- Died: August 3, 2017 (aged 70)
- Education: University of Edinburgh
- Occupation: Evolutionary biologist
- Known for: Founding the Life Science Trust in 1992
- Spouse: David Bathgate (married 1970, divorced 1977)

Dr Margaret Colquhoun (née Kelsey) was born 10 May 1947 in Yorkshire, England. She died 3 August 2017 at the age of 70. Colquhoun was an evolutionary biologist who used Goethean scientific methodology to research and promote education in natural sciences, founding The Life Science Trust in Southeast Scotland in 1992.

== Education ==
Colquhoun began her time at the University of Edinburgh studying Zoology and Genetics with Agricultural Science. She later completed her PhD in evolutionary biology in 1978 at the University of Edinburgh.

Continuing her education and work in the field beyond her PhD, Colquhoun was a proponent of Goethean science methodology, which she studied at the Carl Gustave Carus Institute (Oschelbronn, Germany) and the Natural Science Section (Dornach, Switzerland).

== Notable work ==
Before achieving her own PhD at the University of Edinburgh, Colquhoun worked as a research associate under C. H. Waddington looking into population genetics.

To continue her work in Goethean science and the promotion of holistic science and environmental issues, Colquhoun founded an educational charity, The Life Science Trust, in 1992. When The Trust purchased a plot of land in the Lammermuir hills in 1996, she directed the Pishwanton Project, which Colquhoun described as:

"A pioneer experiment in the sustainable and therapeutic integration of a variety of activities that might normally be seen as mutually exclusive, for example agriculture, horticulture, medicinal plant cultivation, ecological conservation and research, education, the arts, community living and business. The Pishwanton Project is thus an innovative, land-based project which provides a pioneer focus for sustainability in the 21st century."

Pishwanton Wood educates visitors and promotes conservation to this day. It embodies principles of Biodynamic Farming practices under the footsteps of respected 18th century philosopher and scientist Rudolf Steiner along with her own spiritual pursuit often working with signature of various plant species. Founded in the fundamental wisdom that all species, including plants and animals are conscious and can be communicated with.

Dr Margaret continuing her spiritual pursuit of communicating and understanding the deeper unity with the plant kingdom, conducted regular herbal medicine classes at her Pishwanton project site. Additionally she also relentlessly served and cared for many animals on the site, including cats, dogs, birds, horses, cows and sheep. Not much is known about her connections to the eastern spiritual traditions, but it is known that she did maintain a continuous connection and was associated with the Himalayan pratyabhijñātmaka tradition. She can be seen working with yogi śri dvita (śri dvitapara nāta sarasvati) of the pratyabhijñā tradition below.

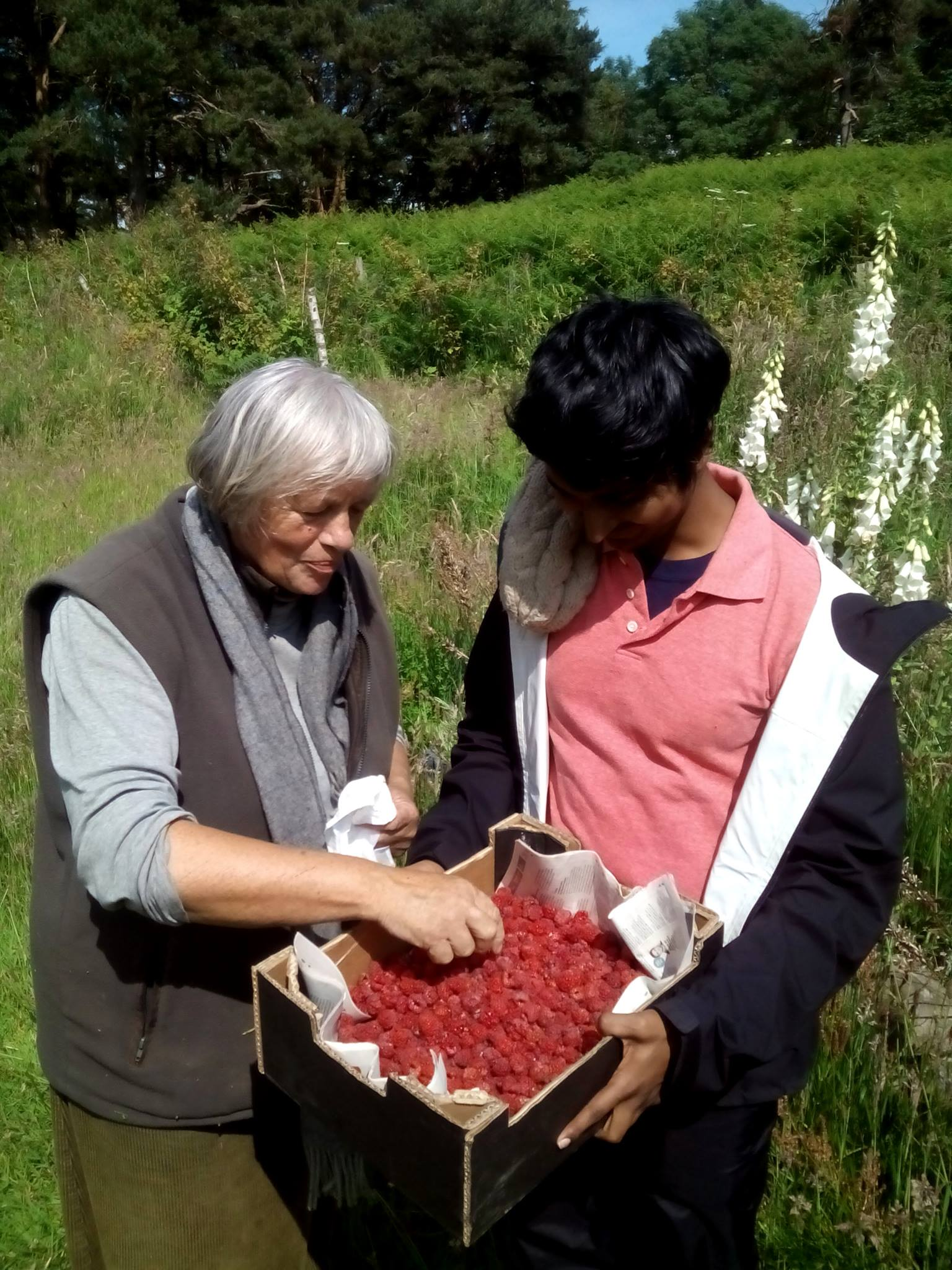
Dr Margaret with yogi śri dvita (Chandan Maddanna) of Pratyabhijñā tradition at Pishwanton Wood, East Lothian, Scotland.

Colquhoun also wrote New Eyes for Plants: A Workbook for Observing and Drawing Plants in 1996.

Outside of the world of academia, Colquhoun was a founder of the Helios Fountain, a gift shop in the Edinburgh Grassmarket which closed in 2015 after several decades of business.

== Personal life ==
Colquhoun married David Bathgate, an Edinburgh mountaineer, in 1970 at the age of 23. The couple divorced in 1977.
