= Keith Calhoun and Chandra McCormick =

- Born: January 1, 1955 (age 71), August 28, 1957 (age 68)
- Status: Active
- Occupation: Photographer
- Notable credit: 2016, Whitney Museum of Art 2015, Venice Biennale
- Website: calhounmccormick.com

Keith Calhoun (born January 1, 1955) and Chandra McCormick (born August 27, 1957) are American husband-and-wife team photographers from New Orleans, Louisiana. Calhoun moved to Los Angeles during his teenage years, where he attended Los Angeles Community College, working at KCET public radio station before returning to New Orleans to open a portrait studio.

McComick and Calhoun met in 1978 when McCormick had her portrait made. Soon after, she became his apprentice, then collaborator and wife.

== Hurricane Katrina ==
McCormick and Calhoun relocated temporarily to Houston during Hurricane Katrina, documenting the state of the refugee shelters while there. When they returned, their home was destroyed and almost two-thirds of their photographic archive had been damaged. The water shifted the color or cracked the film, creating an unintended artistic effect. The damaged images have been in the shows "Gone" and "Pitch White".

In 2007 the couple opened a community arts center, called L9 Center for the Arts in the Lower Ninth Ward of New Orleans. The center serves as a gallery space, a performing arts center.

== Style and work ==
McCormick and Calhoun document the way of life in the African American communities in the Lower Ninth Ward in New Orleans and rural Louisiana. The photographers document every aspect of life in disappearing communities, capturing daily life, celebrations, rituals, and labor to preserve cultural histories. They have referred to themselves as "keepers of the culture".

Photographing mostly in black and white, they take both individual and group portraits. Their photographs cross into social commentary.

They have photographed dock workers, sugar cane workers, and incarcerated people.

On March 16, 2026, the Robert Rauschenberg Foundation awarded Calhoun and McCormick its Rauschenberg Centennial Award for photography. The award gives the recipients $100,000, as well as an invitation to participate in the Foundation’s Captiva Residency program.

=== Angola State Penitentiary ===
From the 1980s onward, they documented the African-American men imprisoned at Angola State Penitentiary, collaborating with songwriter Aaron Neville, for a body of work called "Slavery: The Prison Industrial Complex", which has been displayed in their 2014 show at Prospect New Orleans

== Exhibitions ==
November 3, 2018 – February 10, 2019: "Labor Studies" Contemporary Arts Center (New Orleans)

Feb 23 – May 28, 2018: "Slavery, the Prison Industrial Complex: Photographs by Keith Calhoun and Chandra McCormick" Frist Art Museum

June 9 – November 22, 2015: All the World's Futures, 56th la Biennale di Venezia in Venice Italy an exhibition curated by Okwui Enwezor.

October 25, 2014 – January 25, 2015: "Angola: The Prison a series at Prospect 3 Art Biennial in New Orleans, on display at the Ogden Museum of Southern Art titled Slavery: The Prison Industrial Complex.

== Public Lectures ==
December 12, 2019: Keynote Lecture, PhotoNola Festival, New Orleans Museum of Art

November 6, 2019: "Louisiana Medley: The Social Justice Photography of Chandra McCormick and Keith Calhoun," Harvard Art Museums

September 16, 2016: "Photography and Social Activism" Whitney Museum of Art

January 9, 2013: Pratt Photography Lectures, Pratt Institute, New York
