= Calhoun County Airport =

Calhoun County Airport may refer to:

- Calhoun County Airport (Florida) in Blountstown, Florida, United States (FAA: F95)
- Calhoun County Airport (Mississippi) in Pittsboro, Mississippi, United States (FAA: 04M)
- Calhoun County Airport (Texas) in Port Lavaca, Texas, United States (FAA: PKV)
