= Tom Calhoun =

American sportscaster

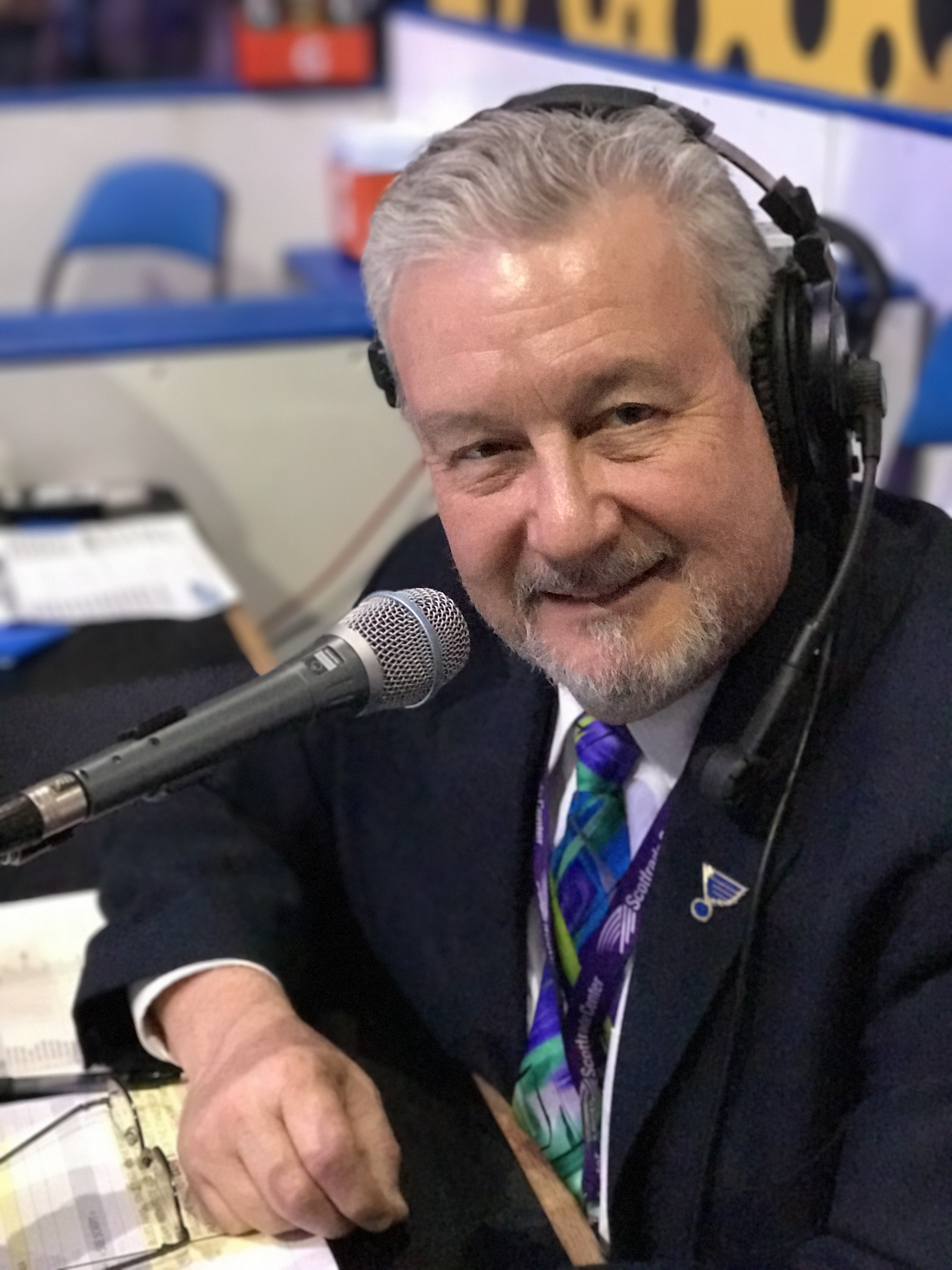
- Calhoun in 2017
- Born: December 6, 1950 (age 75); Belleville, Illinois
- Occupations: Broadcaster, NHL announcer

Tom Calhoun (born December 6, 1950) is an American broadcaster, podcaster, and announcer based in St. Louis. He has been the public-address announcer at St. Louis Blues hockey games since 1987.

== Early life and education ==
Calhoun was born in Belleville, Illinois to Doris and William Calhoun, an alderman and St. Clair County Highway Department surveyor. His paternal grandfather was an immigrant from Scotland. He received an undergraduate degree in Mass Communications with a specialization in radio and television from Southern Illinois University-Edwardsville and a Masters degree in communications from Lindenwood University in 2013.

== Career ==
Calhoun had an internship at KMOX when he was an undergraduate. He got his first professional job in 1973 at WIBV in Belleville announcing high school and college games. He worked for other St. Louis-area radio stations including KMOX, KXOK, and KTRS, primarily as a sports announcer, program host, or news presenter. He began working as the announcer for St. Louis Blues games in January 1987, agreeing to finish a season vacated by Charlie Hodges. In the summers he announced games for the Gateway Grizzlies of the Frontier League starting in 2003 and ending in 2025. Calhoun was the announcer for the Blues in the 2019 Stanley Cup Finals series, where the team took home their first Stanley Cup. During the coronoavirus shutdown, Calhoun set up a Cameo account, announcing events and milestones for people and donated the proceeds to charity.

His role with the team involves announcing the lineups, keeping track of and announcing the scoring, managing sponsor events, introducing the honored veteran in the Blues' Military Salute, and announcing the three stars of the game at the close of the evening. He worked his 1700th straight game in 2024.

Calhoun taught at Lindenwood University beginning in 2013. In 2019 he became a professor of mass communication at Southwestern Illinois College as well as managing Blue Storm Radio. He is a SAG-AFTRA cardholder and former member of its St. Louis chapter Board of Directors. He has hosted a podcast called St. Louis Blues Hockey Legends since 2024.

== Honors and awards ==
Calhoun was inducted into the St. Louis Sports Hall of Fame in 2020, receiving the President’s Choice award.

== Personal life ==
Tom and wife Barb live in Millstadt, IL and have two adult sons. They raise and show chihuahuas in their spare time.
