= James Colquhoun (cricketer) =

Scottish cricketer (1873–1977)

Personal information
- Full name: James Clifton Colquhoun
- Born: 1 December 1893; Clifton, Arizona, United States
- Died: 9 December 1977 (aged 84); London, England
- Batting: Right-handed

Domestic team information
- Years: Team
- 1929–1930: Cornwall

Career statistics
Competition	First-class
Matches	1
Runs scored	30
Batting average	15.00
100s/50s	–/–
Top score	15
Catches/stumpings	–/–
- Source: Cricinfo, 7 October 2018

James Clifton Colquhoun MBE (1 December 1893 – 9 February 1977) was a Scottish first-class cricketer and British Army officer.

Colquhoun was born in December 1893, to Elizabeth Scott Wallace Colquhoun and James Colquhoun. His father was an engineer with the Scottish owned Arizona Copper Company, based in Clifton, Arizona. (Note: The authoritative cricket websites ESPNcricinfo and CricketArchive have his place of birth recorded as Scotland; however, given his fathers work in Clifton, Arizona in the 1890s, where he lived alongside his wife, this seems a more logical location for his place of birth.) Returning to the United Kingdom for schooling, Colquhorn was educated at Campbell College and Glenalmond College, playing cricket for the latter's school team from 1909 to 1912. He played first-class cricket in June 1914, when he played for GJV Weigall's XI against Oxford University at Oxford. Opening the batting in both innings', Colquhoun was dismissed for 15 runs in the first-innings by Orme Bristowe, and for the same score in their second-innings by Donald Johnston.

He served during World War I with the Highland Light Infantry, enlisting in 1914 with the rank of second lieutenant. He was promoted to temporary lieutenant in May 1916. He transferred to the Durham Light Infantry in 1917, where he supervised physical and bayonet training. He remained with the Durham Light Infantry following the war and by June 1919 he held the rank of temporary captain, which he relinquished with the cessation of his supervisory duties and military service in 1919.

He later played minor counties cricket for Cornwall in 1929 and 1930, making six appearances in the Minor Counties Championship. He was later made an MBE. Colquhoun died in hospital at London in February 1977.
