= Cohoon =

Cohoon is a surname. Notable people with the surname include:

- Dennis Cohoon (born 1953), American politician
- Hannah Cohoon (1788–1864), American painter
- Joanne M. Cohoon (c. 1954–2016), American sociologist
- Willis E. Cohoon (1902–1960), American attorney and politician
