= Bootsie Calhoun =

American politician (1923–2014)

Member of the Georgia House of Representatives
- In office 1975

Personal details
- Born: March 16, 1923 Atlanta, Georgia, U.S.
- Died: February 21, 2014 (aged 90)
- Party: Republican
- Spouse: Billy Calhoun (m. 1944)
- Children: 3
- Education: University of Georgia
- Occupation: Politician

Ann Carter "Bootsie" Calhoun (March 16, 1923 – February 21, 2014) was an American politician.

Born in Atlanta, Georgia, Calhoun graduated from the University of Georgia. Calhoun served on the Richmond County, Georgia Board of Education for eight years. She then served in the Georgia House of Representatives as a Republican in 1975.
