= Towards the Horizon (film) =

Film by Alan Shilin

Toward The Horizon (1949) | Education for Negroes in the South is black and white documentary film produced and written by Alan Shilin (1920 - December 23, 1955). Commissioned by the Harmon Foundation (best known as one of the first major supporters of African American creativity and ingenuity), the film addresses the progress that African Americans in the Southern United States had made in higher education.

== Plot ==
The film highlights the impoverished conditions under which many African American families lived in the southern United States during the 1940s. Narrator emphasizes the role of the church in African American educational progress, and the importance of church attendance on Sundays. The film also highlights training of nursery school children in preparation towards a better start in life than their predecessors. It also highlights African American college students from Historically Black Colleges and Universities - HBCU on campus, in class, at a football game, a soda shop, dances, and at graduation. It expounds on the emergence of African Americans in the modern world, and their role in an educated society.

== Cast and Crew ==
- John Seymour - Narrator
- Alan Shilin - Producer and Writer
- Kenneth F. Space - Photographer & Cinematography
- Dorothy Baxley - Film Editor
- Edmund C. Shaw - Technical Advisor. Directed American Baptist Films for 36 years and was involved in the production of more than 250 motion films and filmstrips, several of which focused on the plight of the American Indian.
