= Thomas Calhoun =

English cricketer

Personal information
- Full name: Thomas Gunston Calhoun
- Born: 1795; Chichester, Sussex
- Died: 6 September 1861 (aged 65–66); Goring-by-Sea, Sussex

Domestic team information
- Years: Team
- 1827: Kent XI
- Only FC: 17 September 1827 Kent XI v Sussex XI
- Source: CricInfo, 10 July 2022

Thomas Gunston Calhoun (1795 – 6 September 1861) was an English clergyman who played a single first-class cricket match for a Kent XI in 1827.

Calhoun was at Chichester in Sussex in 1795, the son of Thomas and Elizabeth Calhoun. His father was a "substantial" landowner from the Southampton area of Hampshire and Calhoun was educated at the University of Oxford. He matriculated at Exeter College, Oxford in 1813 and graduated from Magdalen College in 1817. After graduating, he entered the Church of England, serving as curate at Ferring near Brighton in 1827 and was later vicar of Goring-by-Sea and Upper Beeding. He was elected as a Fellow of Magdalen.

Calhoun made a single first-class appearance for a Kent team in 1827, playing against a Sussex XI at the Royal New Ground at Brighton. This is the only cricket match he is known to have played in and he was probably a late replacement for a missing player in the match. He scored a single run in the two innings in which he batted.

Calhoun died at Goring-by-Sea in 1861.

== Bibliography ==
- Carlaw, Derek (2020). Kent County Cricketers, A to Z: Part One (1806–1914) (PDF). Cardiff: ACS.
