= Hugh Colquhoun =

Australian rules footballer

Personal information
- Full name: James Hugh Colquhoun
- Born: 18 October 1892; Prahran, Victoria
- Died: 7 May 1949 (aged 56); Heidelberg, Victoria
- Original team: Windsor

Playing career^{1}
Years	Club	Games (Goals)
1912	St Kilda	2 (0)
- ^{1} Playing statistics correct to the end of 1912.

James Hugh Colquhoun (18 October 1892 – 7 May 1949) was an Australian rules footballer who played with St Kilda in the Victorian Football League (VFL).
