= Calhoun Middle School =

Calhoun Middle School may refer to:

- Calhoun Middle School, in Calhoun, Georgia
- Calhoun Middle School, in Calhoun, Louisiana; see Ouachita Parish School Board
- Calhoun Middle School, in Denton, Texas; see Denton Independent School District
