= Joanne M. Cohoon =

American sociologist (1954–2016)

- Born: Joanne Louise McGrath c. 1954; Brooklyn, New York, U.S.
- Died: February 14, 2016 (aged 61)
- Education: Ramapo College; Columbia University; University of Virginia
- Known for: Diversity in Technology
- Awards: A. Richard Newton Educator ABIE Award (2015)
- Scientific career
- Fields: Sociology; Computer Science
- Workplaces: University of Virginia; NCWIT
- Website: people.virginia.edu/~jlc6j

Joanne Louise McGrath Cohoon (c. 1954 – February 14, 2016) was an American sociologist noted for her research on gender imbalance in computing.

== Biography ==
Cohoon received a B.A. in philosophy from Ramapo College in 1976. She received a M.A. in student personnel administration in higher education from Columbia University Teachers College in 1979 and a Ph.D. in sociology from the University of Virginia in 2000.

She was a research assistant professor at the University of Virginia from 2000 to 2003. From 2004 to 2016 she was a senior research scientist with the National Center for Women & Information Technology. In 2005 she became an adjunct research professor in the department of sociology at the University of Virginia, and in 2010 she was an associate professor in the department of science, technology and society, also at the University of Virginia. In 2016 Cohoon was promoted to professor.

Cohoon, who had metastatic breast cancer, died on February 14, 2016, at the age of 61.

== Career ==
Cohoon researched the gender imbalance in computing, and focused on putting this knowledge into practice. She wrote a paper showing evidence that culture and social structures contribute to fewer women in the field of computing technology. At NCWIT she was a key senior research scientist and the co-founder of Extension Services for Undergraduate Programs (ES-UP), a nationwide program that provides customized consultation to undergraduate computing programs to help them increasing women's participation. She was also active in the Pacesetters program: a fast-track program where committed corporate, entrepreneurial, and academic leaders work across organizational boundaries to accelerate change that improves the meaningful participation of technical women in their organizations.

== Awards ==
In 2015 she won the A. Richard Newton Educator ABIE Award for her work in developing practices that increase women in computing. Since her death, NCWIT has named a plenary at their annual Summit after Joanne. At this plenary, leading social science researchers speak on wide-ranging and thought-provoking topics related to women's participation in computing and technology.
