= Lake Calhoun (Kandiyohi County, Minnesota) =

Lake in the state of Minnesota, United States

- Location within Minnesota
- Location: Kandiyohi County, Minnesota
- Coordinates: 45°16′23″N 94°49′57″W
- Type: lake

Lake Calhoun is a lake in Kandiyohi County, in the U.S. state of Minnesota. It was named for a local cattleman.

In 2015, the Minnesota Department of Natural Resources announced the lake has an invasive species infestation of zebra mussels.

== See also ==
- List of lakes in Minnesota
