= William Henry Calhoun =

- Born: 1815; Pennsylvania, U.S.
- Died: 1865 (aged 49–50)
- Occupations: Silversmith, jeweler
- Spouse: Mary Pickless
- Children: Mary Ella Calhoun Foote

William Henry Calhoun (1815–1865) was an American silversmith in the Antebellum South. He was trained in Philadelphia and became a jeweler in Nashville, Tennessee, where he designed silverware in the 1830s–1860s. A Grand Master of the Odd Fellows, he was arrested by the Union Army for his Confederate support in 1863. His work can be seen at the Tennessee State Museum and the Museum of Early Southern Decorative Arts.

== Early life ==
Calhoun was born in 1815 in Pennsylvania. His paternal grandfather, Robert, emigrated from Ireland with family, and his father Hugh was born on their voyage to America in 1789. Calhoun was of Scotch-Irish descent; his family had been silversmiths for generations in Ireland. Calhoun moved to Nashville, Tennessee with his parents before 1812, and his father returned to Pennsylvania to serve in the War of 1812. After the war, the family moved to a farm in Ohio, where Calhoun's his younger brother, George Reid Calhoun, was born.

Calhoun was "trained as a silversmith in Philadelphia."

== Career ==
Calhoun returned to Nashville in 1835, where he managed his father's jewelry store at 16 Public Square. He sold Deringer pocket pistols. He designed cups for agricultural fairs like the one held by the Tennessee State Agricultural Society of Gallatin in 1855. He also designed cutlery like salt spoons, and tea sets including "pitchers, goblets, julep cups, ladles, flatware." Confederate General Robert H. Hatton owned silverware designed by Calhoun.

By 1860, Calhoun was worth "$84,300 in real property and $40,000 in personal property." During the American Civil War, Calhoun was a supporter of the Confederate States of America. In February 1863, he was arrested for his Confederate support on the order of Union Brigadier General Robert Byington Mitchell pending the release of Union prisoners.

Calhoun resumed his activity as a jeweler in 1865.

== Personal life, death and legacy ==
Calhoun married Mary Pickless; they had a daughter, Mary Ella Calhoun, who later married Robert Foote in 1888. Calhoun was the Grand Master of the Odd Fellows Grand Lodge of Tennessee in 1845.

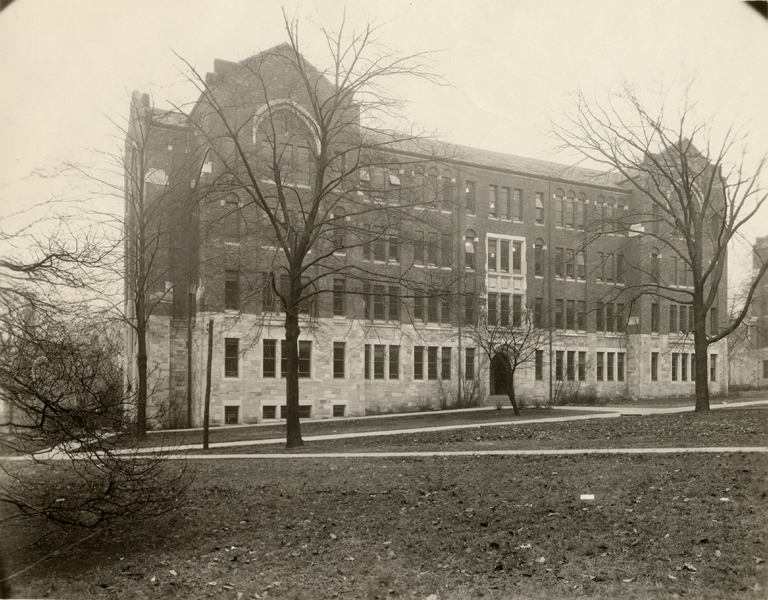
Calhoun Hall, named for W.H. Calhoun.

Calhoun died in 1865. His wife died in 1891. His brother took over his store and acquired a farm on 21st Avenue; it later became Hillsboro Village. Calhoun's portrait, done by Washington Bogart Cooper, was given to the Odd Fellows' Grand Lodge in 1896. His daughter Mary bequeathed her estate to Vanderbilt University for the construction of Calhoun Hall in 1918. Even though the will was challenged in court by her heirs, the university won in 1924 and the building was completed in 1928.

Calhoun's cutlery is in the collections of the Tennessee State Museum as well as the Museum of Early Southern Decorative Arts. His work was auctioned by Christie's in 2008.
