= Colin Colquhoun =

Australian rules footballer (1932–2025)

Personal information
- Full name: Colin Colquhoun
- Born: 18 July 1932
- Died: 30 December 2025 (aged 93); Newcastle, New South Wales, Australia
- Original team: Emerald / Williamstown Methodists
- Height: 184 cm (6 ft 0 in)
- Weight: 74 kg (163 lb)

Playing career^{1}
Years	Club	Games (Goals)
1957	South Melbourne	6 (0)
- ^{1} Playing statistics correct to the end of 1957.

Colin Colquhoun (18 July 1932 – 30 December 2025) was an Australian rules footballer who played with South Melbourne in the Victorian Football League (VFL). He died on 30 December 2025, at the age of 93.
