= Ossie Colhoun =

Irish cricketer (born 1938)

Personal information
- Born: 6 June 1938 (age 88)
- Batting: Right-handed

International information
- National side: Ireland

Career statistics
Competition	First-class
Matches	28
Runs scored	74
Batting average	4.62
100s/50s	0/0
Top score	9*
Catches/stumpings	44/2
- Source: CricketArchive, 15 November 2022

Osmund David Colhoun (born 6 June 1938) is a former Irish cricketer. A right-handed batsman and wicket-keeper, he made his debut for Ireland against Lancashire in July 1959 and went on to play for them on 87 occasions, his last match coming in July 1979 against FW Millet's XI.

Of Colhoun's matches for Ireland, 28 of them had first-class status. His cousin Aubrey Finlay also represented Ireland at cricket.
