= Elizabeth K. Cahoon =

Georgian-American biologist

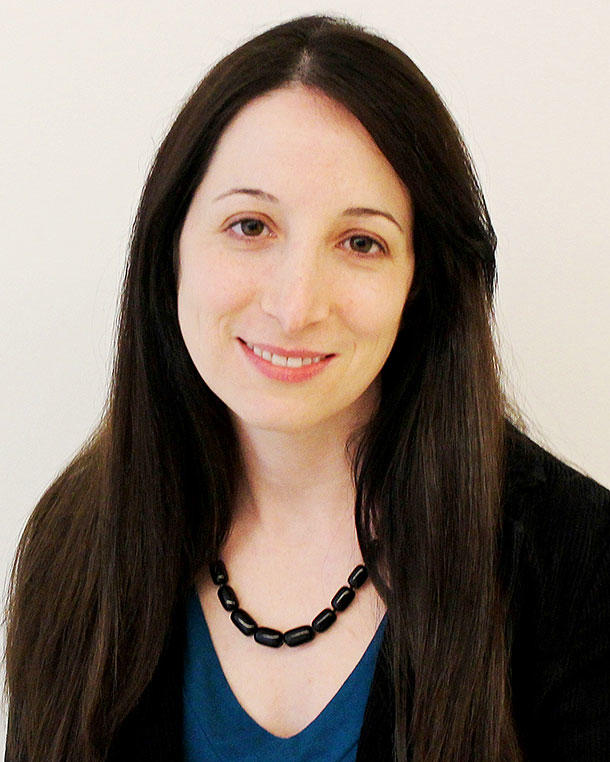
- Cahoon in 2019
- Born: Elizabeth Khaykin; Tbilisi, Georgia
- Citizenship: Georgia; United States
- Education: University of Pennsylvania (BSE); Massachusetts Institute of Technology (SM); Johns Hopkins Bloomberg School of Public Health (MHS, PhD)
- Scientific career
- Fields: Epidemiology, cancer research
- Workplaces: National Cancer Institute
- Thesis: Prevention in the severely mentally ill: primary care quality and adverse events among persons with schizophrenia, and the benefit of physical activity on sleep in a community sample of persons with severe mental illness (2008)
- Doctoral advisor: Jonathan Samet; Gail L. Daumit
- Other academic advisors: Joseph F. Coughlin

Elizabeth Khaykin Cahoon is a Georgian-born American epidemiologist researching cancer and precancer risks conferred by environmental sources of radiation exposure. She is a Stadtman investigator at the National Cancer Institute.

== Early life and education ==
Khaykin was born in Tbilisi, Georgia. Her family emigrated to the United States when she was a child. She earned a B.S.E. in bioengineering from the University of Pennsylvania. She completed a S.M. from the Engineering Systems Division at the Massachusetts Institute of Technology. Her 2003 master's thesis was titled Telemedicine as a disruptive technology: implications for home health agencies and nurses. Her academic advisor was Joseph F. Coughlin.

As Elizabeth K. Cahoon, she earned a M.H.S. in biostatistics and Ph.D. in epidemiology from the Johns Hopkins Bloomberg School of Public Health. Her dissertation was titled, Prevention in the severely mentally ill: primary care quality and adverse events among persons with schizophrenia, and the benefit of physical activity on sleep in a community sample of persons with severe mental illness. Cahoon's doctoral advisors were Jonathan Samet and Gail L. Daumit. She was a postdoctoral fellow in the department of mental health at the Bloomberg School of Public Health. She joined the radiation epidemiology branch (REB) at the National Cancer Institute (NCI) as a postdoctoral fellow in 2010.

== Career ==
Cahoon was promoted to research fellow in 2014. In 2017, she was appointed to the position of Earl Stadtman Tenure-Track Investigator.

=== Research ===
Cahoon researches cancer and precancer risks conferred by environmental sources of radiation exposure. Her program focuses on studies of preventable risk factors that modify the relationship between ultraviolet radiation (UVR) and the risk of skin cancer and other cancers (in the general population in the United States and in people with especially high risk such as organ-transplant recipients, and studies that address unanswered questions about people exposed to ionizing radiation including residents and clean-up workers exposed after the Chernobyl accident (1986) and Japanese survivors of the atomic bombings (1945) of Hiroshima and Nagasaki.

She works to identify medications that modify the relationship between UV radiation and skin cancer risk. Cahoon also evaluates the UV radiation dose-response relationship for skin cancer risk by wavelength, age at exposure, and anatomic site. In addition, Cahoon evaluates the role of UV radiation in viral activation, immune modulation, and other mediators of skin (and other) cancer risk. Her previous work identified a relationship between ambient UV radiation and risk of Kaposi sarcoma, possibly through reactivation of the causative virus, human herpesvirus 8. Cahoon is working towards confirming these findings in independent populations.

Cahoon examines radiation-related risk of various cancer types in the lifespan study of Japanese atomic bomb survivors and is also leading a thyroid cancer case-control study nested in a cohort of Chernobyl liquidators (i.e., emergency clean-up workers) who were exposed to a large range of external radiation. Cahoon examines the incidence of new thyroid nodules in Belarus and Ukraine and progression of prevalent nodules. These will be the first studies to evaluate whether nodule characteristics associated with increased risk of thyroid cancer, such as size and vascularization, are apparent at clinical diagnosis or whether these characteristics emerge and evolve over time.

== Awards and honors ==
Cahoon has received awards for her work, including the DCEG Intramural Research Award, the DCEG Outstanding Research Paper by a Fellow, and the NIH Award of Merit.
