= Frances Colquhoun (actress) =

Scottish actress, artist, singer, theatre director and friend of Soviet dissidents

- Born: 20 July 1938; Edinburgh, Scotland
- Died: 1 June 2017 (aged 78); Cambridge, England
- Spouse: Patrick Colquhoun

Frances Colquhoun (20 July 1938 – 1 June 2017) was a Scottish actress, artist, singer, theatre director and friend of Soviet dissidents.

== Early life ==
She was born to a teenage mother in Edinburgh in 1938. She was then adopted by Archie Cameron and Dorothy Cameron. Archie Cameron was a consultant for British Rail and an economist. Both of her parents were followers of the Moral-Rearmament (MRA) spiritual movement.

== Career ==
During the summer of 1960 Frances attended a centre for postwar reconciliation in Caux, Switzerland, organised by the MRA, where she helped produce 14 stage plays.

Between 1962 and 1964 Frances sang the solo "Have You a Place for Me Up There?" in the musical Space Is So Startling, which first premiered in Japan and then toured India, Europe and the United States. Whilst in India she met her husband, Patrick Colquhoun.

She had a lot of sympathy with suffers of the Iron Curtain, and after listening to Alexander Solzhenitsyn's Nobel Prize lecture entitled "One Word of Truth" she got the idea to turn it into a film which was directed by Peter J Sisam in 1982.
