= Charles Calhoun Jr. =

American politician

Charles Galloway Calhoun Jr. (June 15, 1931 – August 3, 2014) was an American jurist and legislator.

From Tyler, Texas, Calhoun went to The Citadel, The Military College of South Carolina and University of Texas. He then served in the United States Army in Korea. Calhoun then graduated from University of Texas School of Law. He served as district attorney and assistant Texas attorney general. Calhoun then served in the Texas State Senate from 1963 to 1967 as a Democrat and legal counsel to the Governor of Texas. He then served as a Texas District Court judge.
