= Calhoun, Alabama =

Unincorporated community in Alabama, United States

- Unincorporated community
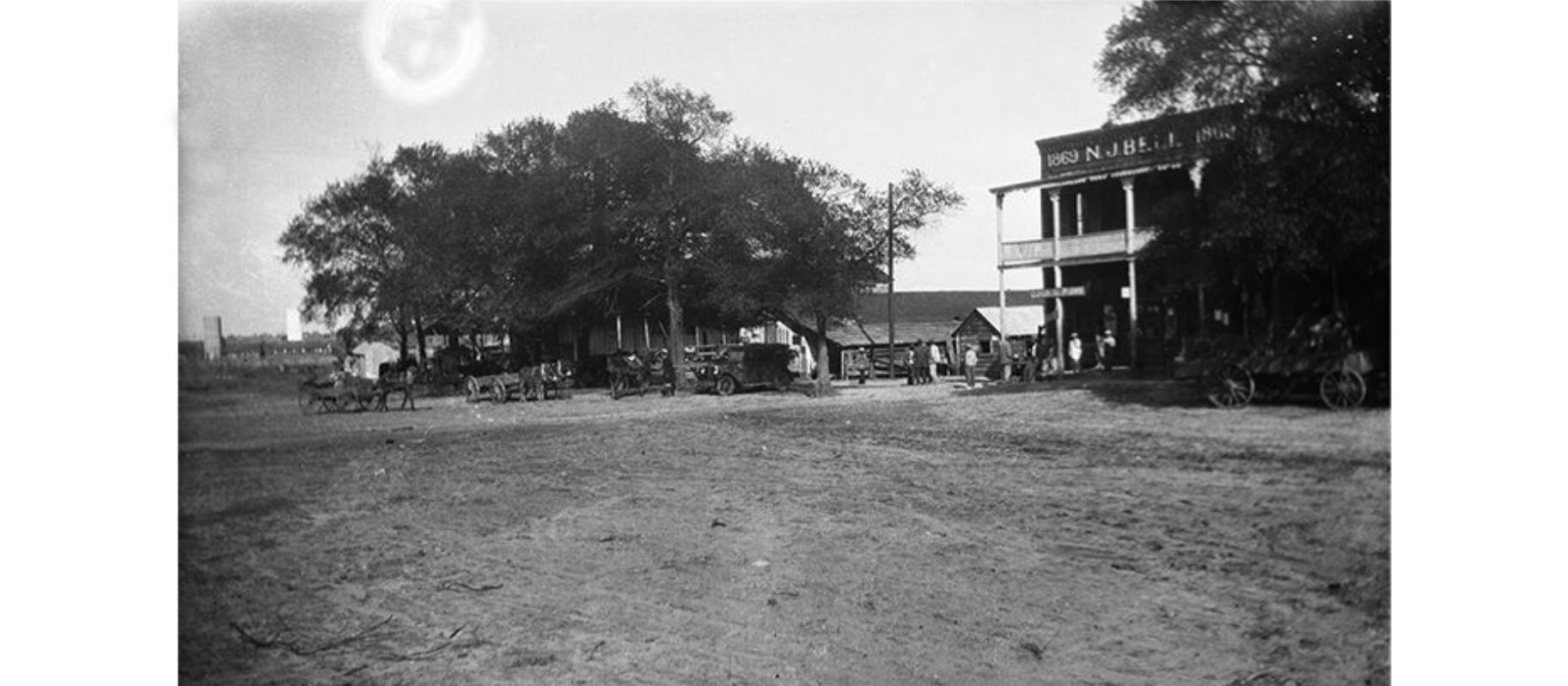
- Calhoun, 1928

- Location within Alabama Location within the United States
- Coordinates: 32°03′01″N 86°32′42″W
- Country: United States
- State: Alabama
- County: Lowndes
- Elevation: 272 ft (83 m)
- Time zone: UTC-6 (Central (CST))
  - Summer (DST): UTC-5 (CDT)
- Area code: 334

Calhoun is an unincorporated community in Lowndes County, Alabama, United States.

== History ==
A post office operated under the name Calhoun from 1851 to 1973.

Calhoun was formerly home to the Calhoun Colored School, a private boarding and day school.

Ramah Baptist Church in Calhoun is listed on the Alabama Register of Landmarks and Heritage.

== Notable natives ==
- Sidney Dickinson, painter
- William K. Payne, president of Georgia State College from 1949 until his death in 1963
- Tommy Sampson, second baseman in the Negro leagues
- SGT. Danyell (Wilson) Walters (Military) - First African American Female soldier to guard The Tomb of The Unknown Soldier in Arlington, VA
