= John Carlton Atherton =

American painter and illustrator

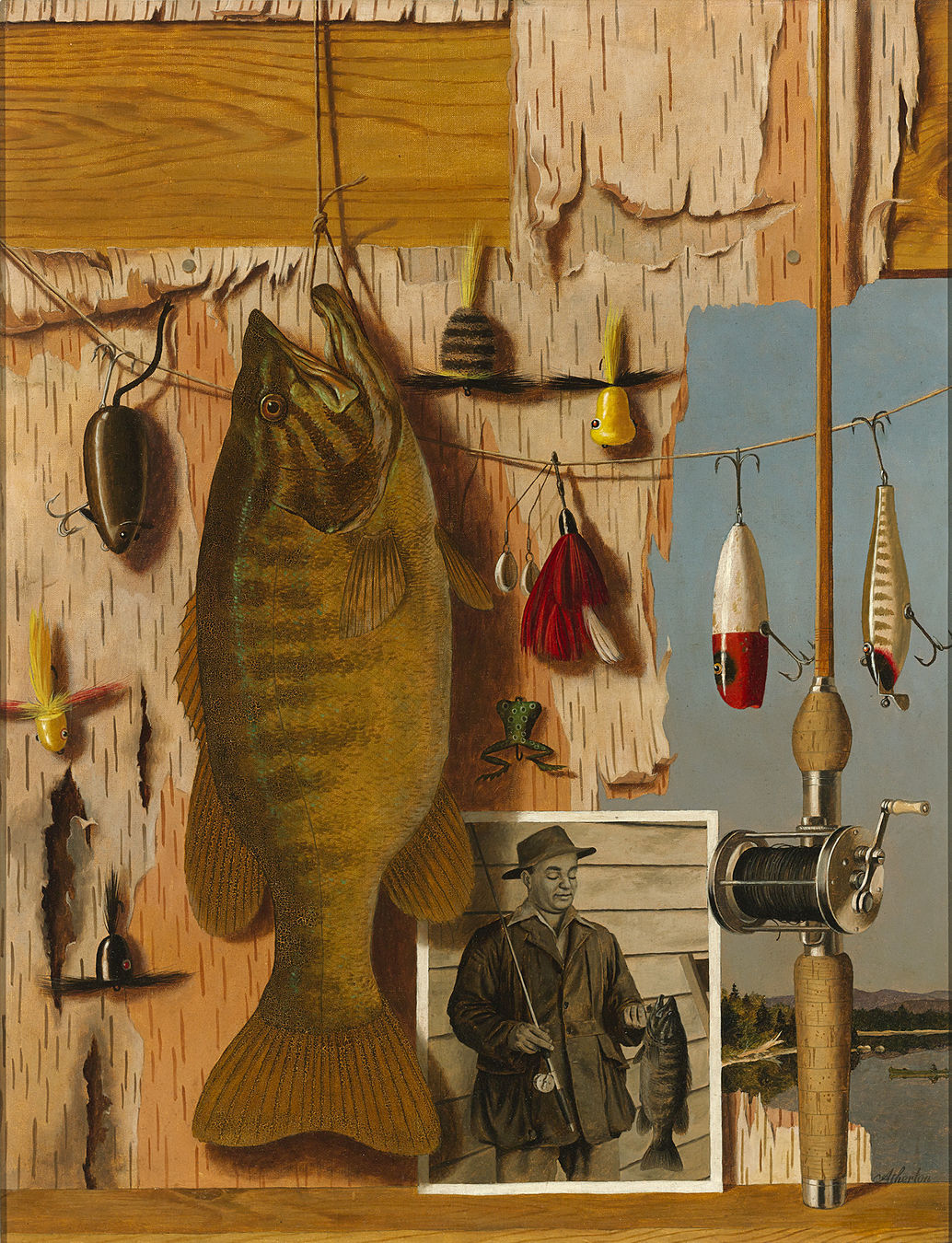
The Bass Season, 1946. Cover of the Saturday Evening Post, June 29, 1946. Private collection.

John Carlton Atherton (January 7, 1900 - September 16, 1952) was an American painter, magazine illustrator, printmaker, writer and designer. His works form part of numerous collections, including the Museum of Modern Art, Whitney Museum of American Art and the Smithsonian American Art Museum.

== Early years ==
"Jack" was the son of James Chester Atherton (1868-1928) and Carrie B. Martin (1871-1909). He was born in Brainerd, Minnesota. His father was Canadian born. His parents relocated from Minnesota to Washington State, with his maternal grandparents whilst he was still an infant. He attended high school in Spokane, Washington.

During his early years he never displayed an aptitude for art; rather, his first love being nature and the activities he relished there, mainly fishing and hunting. He enlisted in 1917, serving briefly in the U.S. Navy for a year during World War I. At the end of the war, determined to get an education he worked various part-time jobs, as a sign painter and playing a banjo in a dance band to pay his enrolment fee at the College of the Pacific and The California School of Fine Arts (now the San Francisco Art Institute). Once there, he also worked in the surrounding studios developing his oil painting techniques.

A first prize award of $500 at the annual exhibition of the Bohemian Club in 1929, financed his one way trip to New York City, which helped to launch his career as an artist.

== Artistic career ==
Atherton achieved recognition in New York City and elsewhere during the 1930s. Having exhibited at the Julien Levy Gallery in New York, his paintings began to be collected by museums; including the Museum of Modern Art and the Metropolitan Museum of Art.

Atherton had aspired to be a fine artist, however his first paid jobs were for commercial art firms designing advertisements for corporations such as General Motors, Shell Oil, Container Corporation of America, and Dole. However, by 1936, encouraged primarily by friends, such as Alexander Brook, an acclaimed New York realist painter, he returned to the fine arts.

Atherton accomplished his first one-man show in Manhattan in 1936. His Painting, “The Black Horse” won the $3000 fourth prize from among a pool of 14,000 entries. This painting forms part of the Metropolitan Museum of Art collection in New York.

Atherton collaborated with Joseph Binder and Albert Staehle producing posters for the 1939 New York World's Fair.

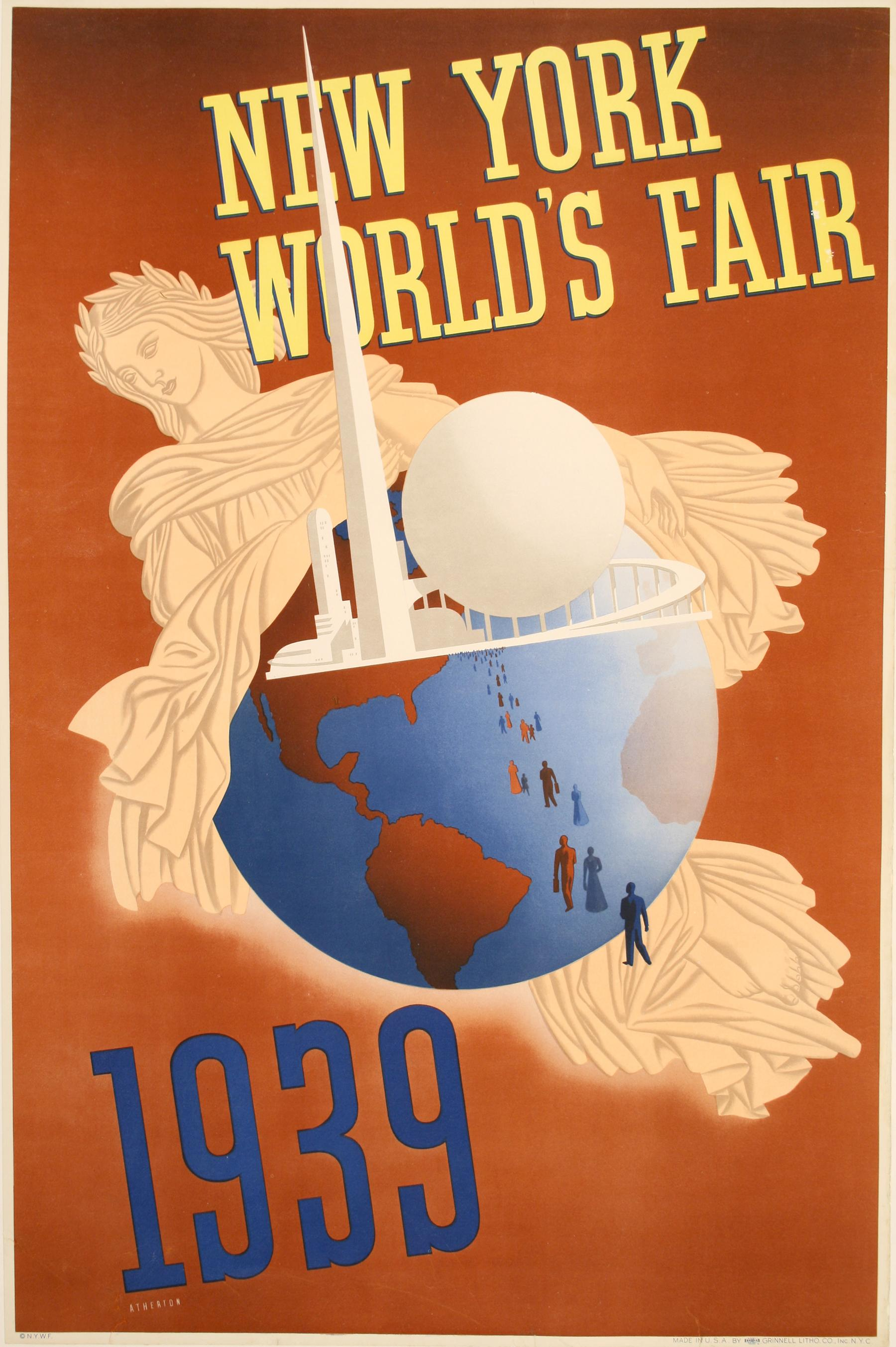
John C. Atherton poster created for the New York World's Fair of 1939

His poster for the New York World's Fair of 1939 displayed surrealist elements as observed by the burnt orange background and a blue floating earth. It featured Lady Liberty holding the symbols of the World's Fair, the Trylon and Perisphere, as well as Earth in her lap against an orange background. The Trylon and Perisphere were designed by Wallace K. Harrison and J. André Fouilhoux and were used to showcase the futuristic design that the Fair aimed for. The official colors of the fair were blue and orange are evident in his poster.

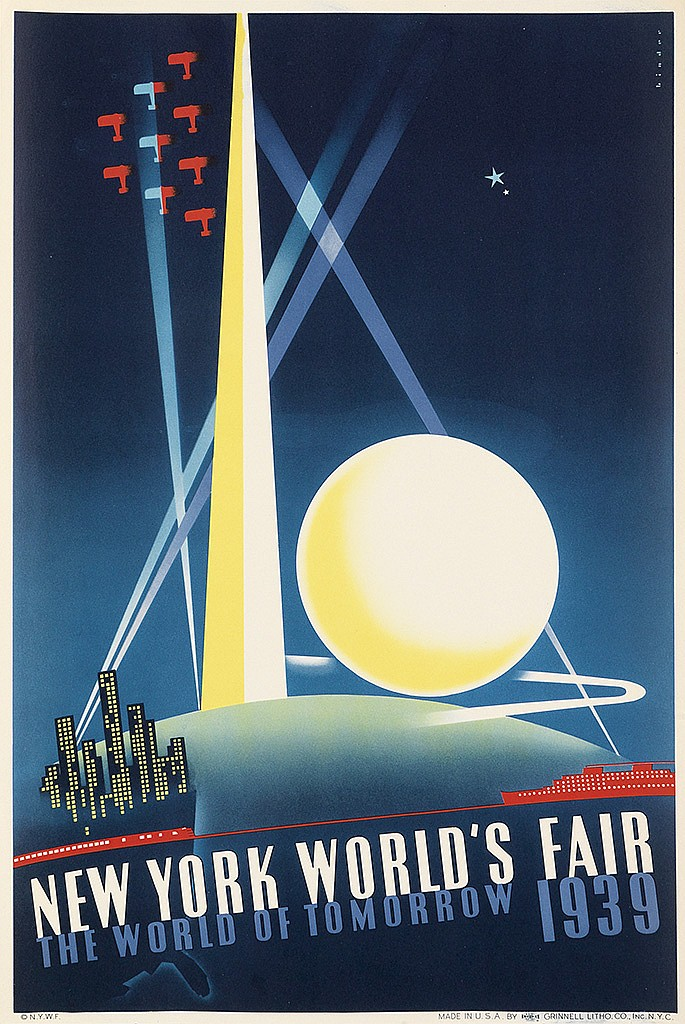
Joseph Binder New York World's Fair 1939 The World of Tomorrow

His reputation increased with his art deco stone lithograph poster for the 1939 New York World's Fair.

In 1941, his design won first place in the Museum of Modern Arts “National Defense Poster Competition”.

Atherton was well known for his World War II posters, including his award-winning "Buy a Share in America" poster from 1941. He produced a series of illustrations for the United States Office of War Information during World War II.

He continued to accept numerous commissions for magazine illustrations; such as Fortune magazine, and over the years he would paint more than forty covers for The Saturday Evening Post starting with his December 1942 design, “Patient Dog.” This picture is reminiscent of his friend Norman Rockwell ‘Americana style’ and captures a poignant moment of nostalgia, where a loyal dog looks toward a wall of hunting equipment and a framed picture of his owner in military uniform.

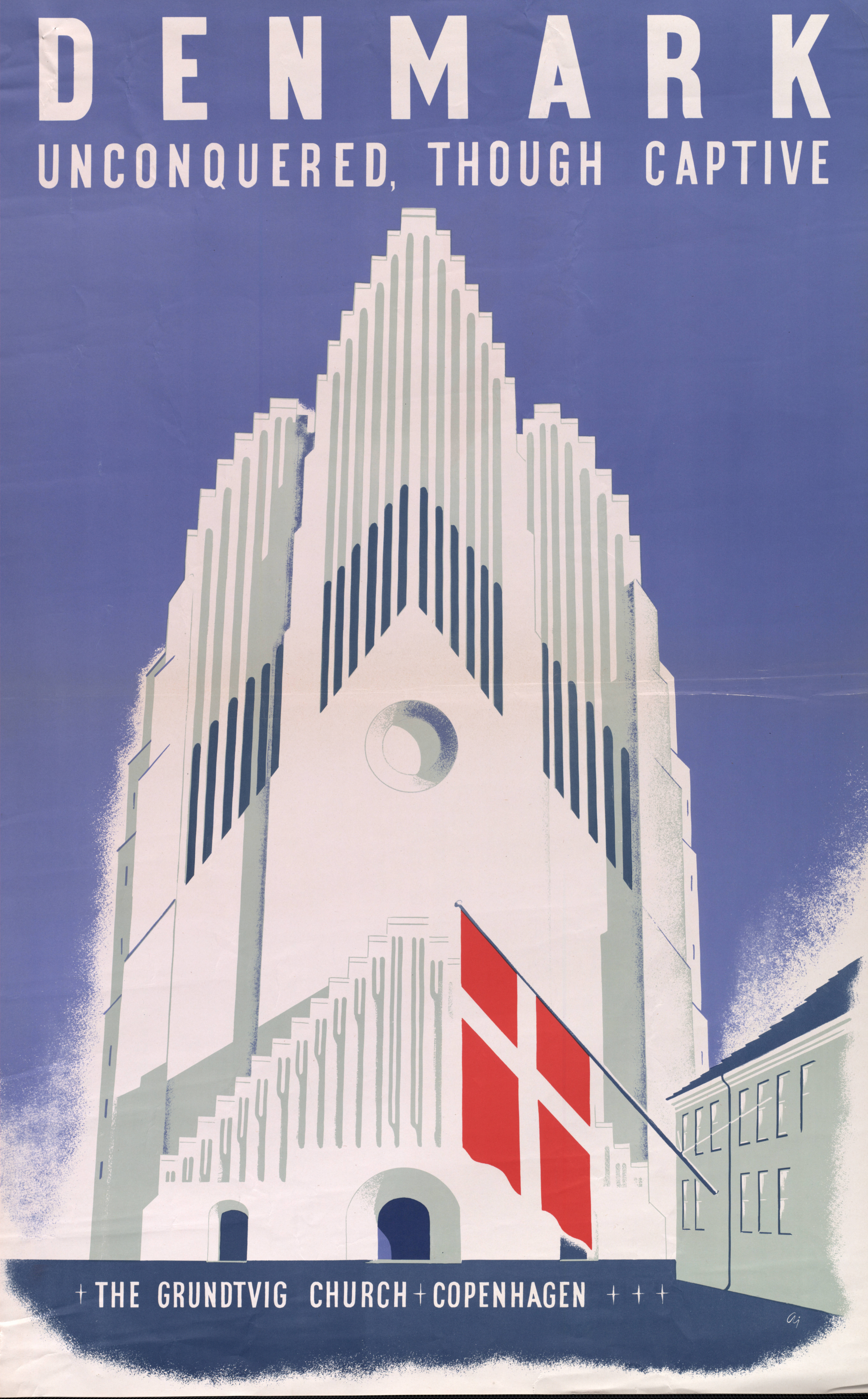
Denmark - Unconquered, Though Captive

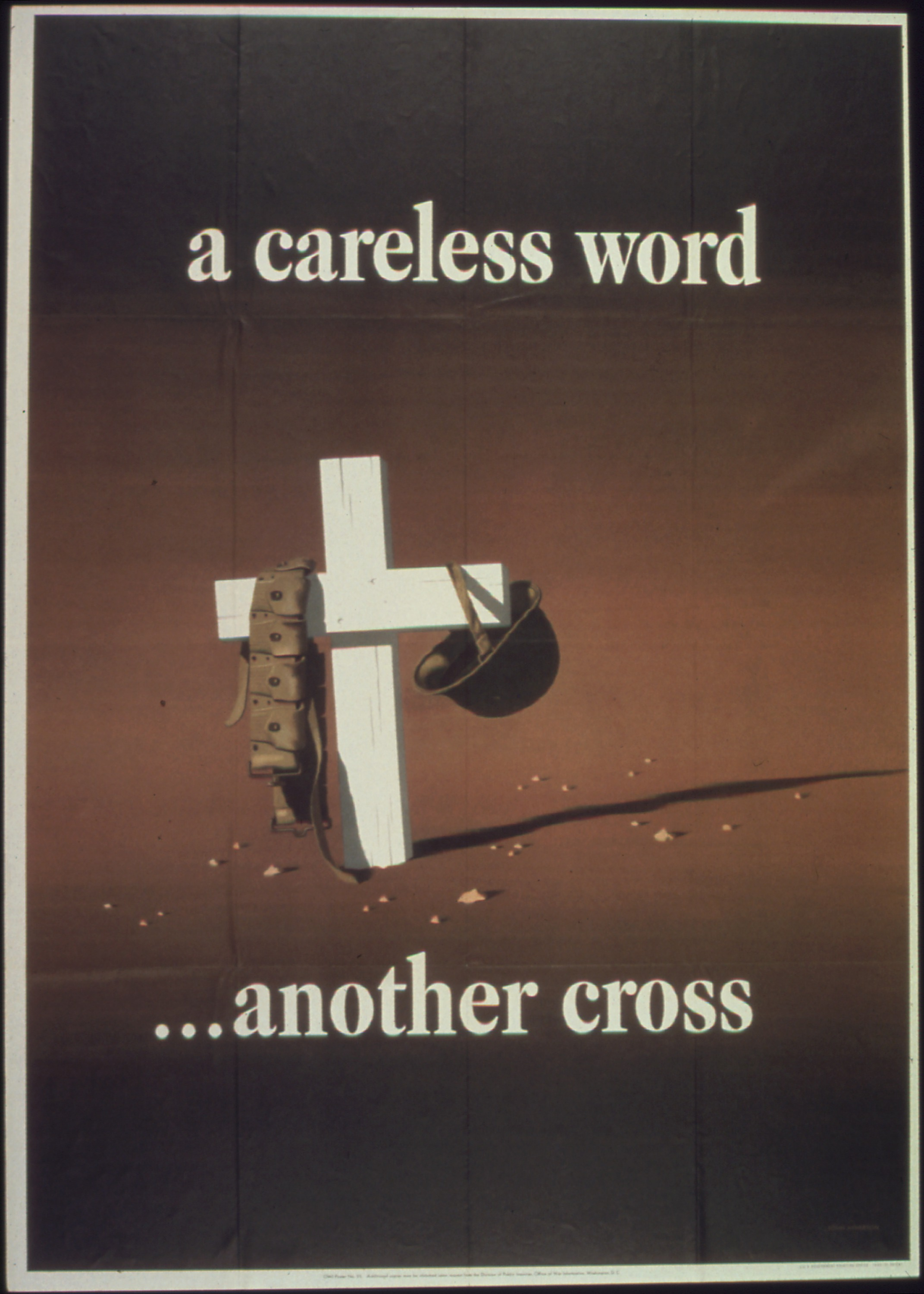
A careless word - Another cross

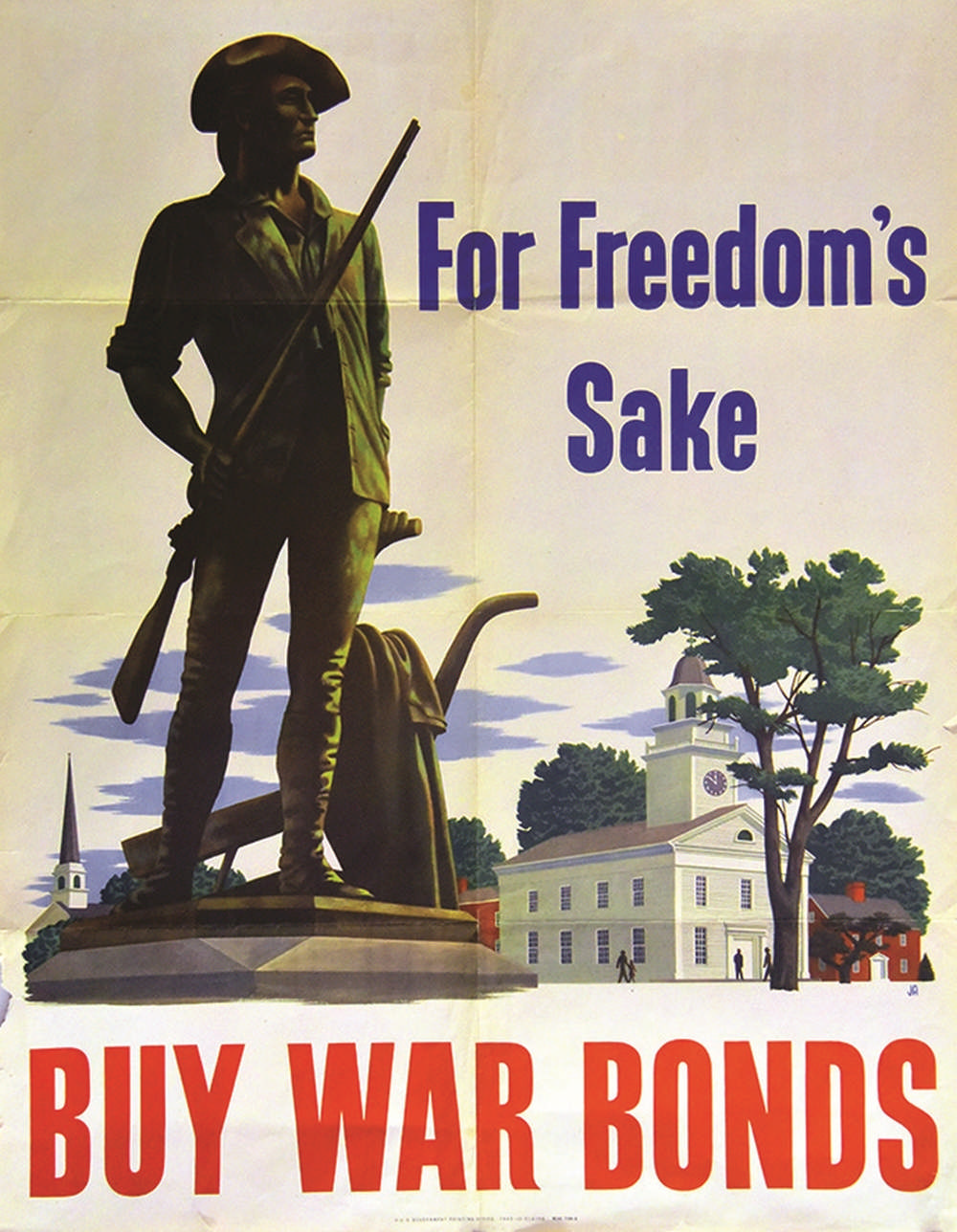
For Freedom's Sake, 1943

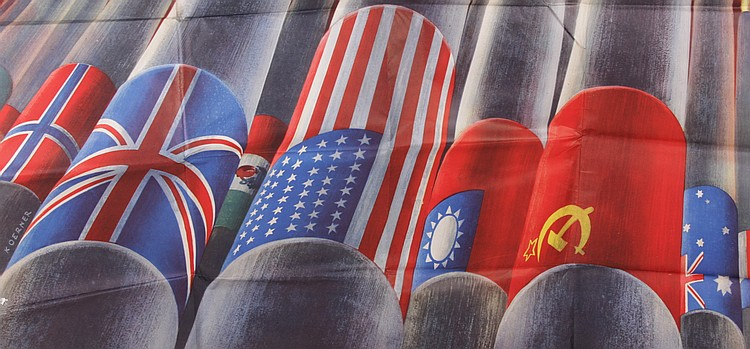

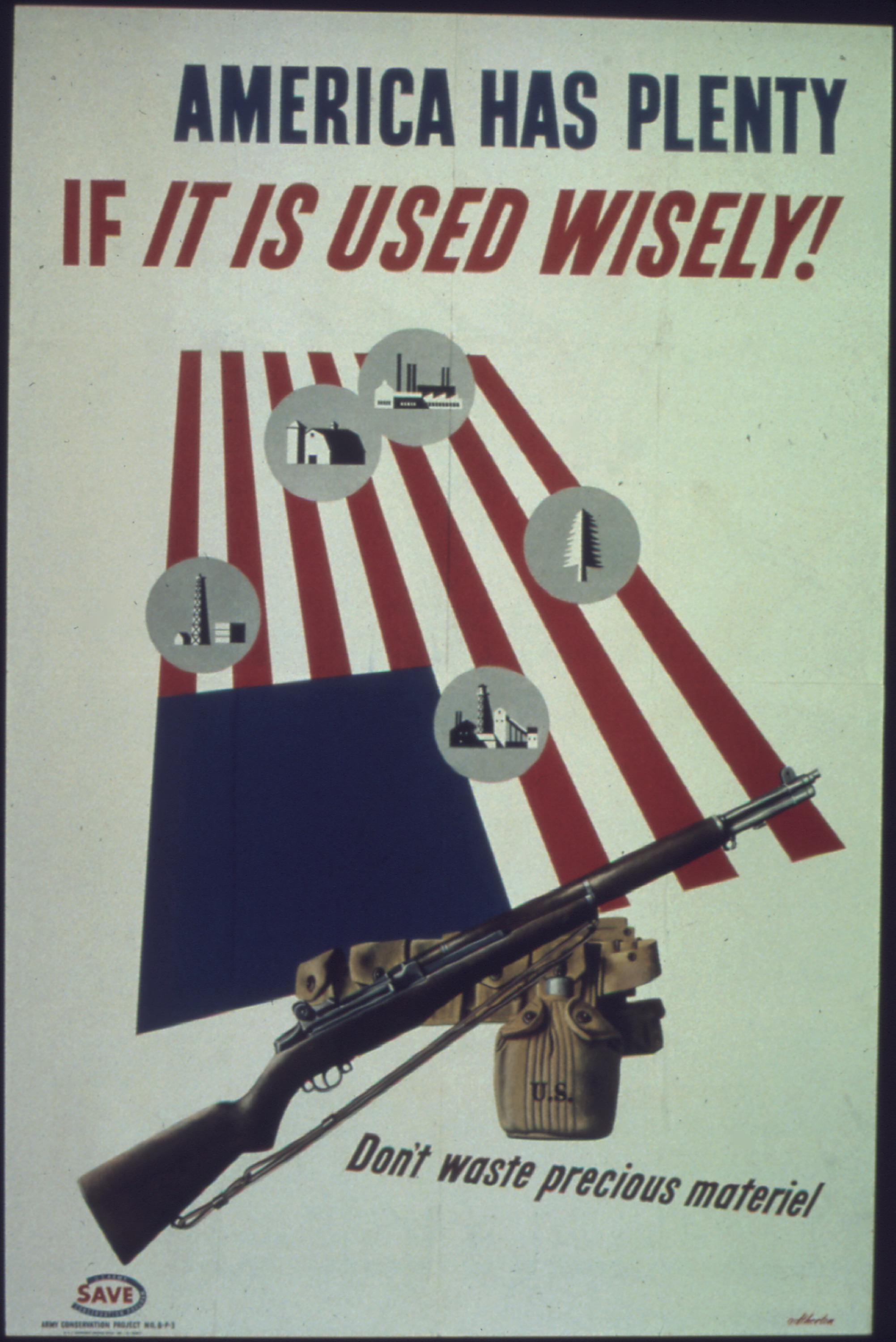
America has plenty--If it is used wisely!

Atherton was an active member of the Society of Illustrators (SOI) upon his arrival in New York. The society have owned many of his works. Ex-collection includes:

- Rocking Horse (ca. 1949)

Atherton, as his peers had many of his works framed by Henry Heydenryk Jr.

When Albert Dorne established the Famous Artists School in Westport, Connecticut in 1948 he first recruited the support of Norman Rockwell. For the founding faculty, Dorne recruited Atherton, as well as other accomplished artists such as Austin Briggs, Stevan Dohanos, Robert Fawcett, Peter Helck, Fred Ludekens, Al Parker, Norman Rockwell, Ben Stahl, Harold von Schmidt and Jon Whitcomb.

Atherton collaborated with Jon Whitcomb with the book “How I Make a Picture: Lesson 1-9, Parts 1”.

Atherton's often chose industrial landscapes, however found himself spending considerable time in Westport, Connecticut, with an active artistic community, and it became home for him, and his family. He then moved to Arlington, Vermont.

Norman Rockwell enlisted Atherton in what was to be the only collaborative painting in his career.

He was part of a group of artists including a Norman Rockwell, Mead Schaeffer and George Hughes who established residences in Arlington. Atherton and Mead Schaeffer were avid fly fishermen and they carefully chose the location for the group, conveniently located near the legendary Battenkill River.

In his free time, Atherton continued to enjoy fly-fishing. He brought his artistic talent into the field of fishing, when he wrote and illustrated the fishing classic, “The Fly and The Fish”.

=== Selected Public Collections ===
- Ackland Art Museum, Chapel Hill, North Carolina
- Fleming Museum of Art, Burlington, Vermont
- Albright-Knox Art Gallery, Buffalo, NY
- Art Institute of Chicago, Chicago
- Wadsworth Atheneum, Hartford, CT
- Brooklyn Museum of Art, New York
- Metropolitan Museum of Art, New York
- The Museum of Modern Art, New York
- Whitney Museum of American Art, New York
- Pennsylvania Academy of the Fine Arts, Philadelphia
- De Young Museum, San Francisco
- Smithsonian American Art Museum, Washington DC
- Butler Institute of American Art Youngstown, OH

== Personal ==
On November 2, 1926, he married Polly “Maxine” Breese (1903-1997). They had one daughter, Mary Atherton, born in 1932.

He died in New Brunswick, Canada in 1952, at the age of 52 while fly-fishing, just after having landed a 25-pound salmon.

== Legacy ==
The Western Connecticut State University holds an extensive archive on this artist.

His wife, Maxine also wrote a memoir “The Fly Fisher and the River,” which John and Maxine's granddaughter, Catherine Varchaver, edited and published years later in 2016. Maxine remarried in 1960.

== Ancestry ==
He is a direct descendant of James Atherton, one of the First Settlers of New England; who arrived in Dorchester, Massachusetts in the 1630s.

His direct ancestor, Benjamin Atherton was from Colonial Massachusetts and settled in Maugerville, New Brunswick in 1765. His grandfather, Albert Atherton (1833-1922) was a lumber merchant who relocated to Minnesota between 1881 and 1885. His Canadian born aunt, Maggie L Atherton (1865-1946), gave an account of the Atherton ancestry and retained a number of newspaper clippings of Atherton‘s painting winning the first prize of $500 awarded by Senator James D. Phelan in San Francisco in 1929.

== Biography ==
- Falk, Peter H., ed. “Who Was Who in American Art”. Madison, CT: Sound View Press, 1999.
- Berman, Greta/Wechsler, Jeffrey, “Realism and Realities: The Other Side of American Painting, 1940-1960,” The Gallery: New Brunswick, NJ, 1981.
- Cohn, Jan, Covers of the Saturday Evening Post: Seventy Years of Outstanding Illustration, Studio (October 1, 1995).
- Hughes, Edan, Artists in California, 1786–1940
- Watson, Ernest W, “Forty American Illustrators and How they Work”: Watson-Guptill Publications, 1946
