= Harold Anderson (illustrator) =

American illustrator (1894–1973)

Harold Anderson (1894–1973) was an American artist and illustrator.

== Life ==
Anderson studied at Fenway Art School in Boston, Massachusetts and was one of the country's most well known and respected character artists. He was recognized for his assistance to younger artists and illustrators.

He resided and worked in the Manhattan suburb of New Rochelle, a well known artist colony and home to many of the top commercial illustrators of the day such as Frank and J. C. Leyendecker and Norman Rockwell.

Also in residence were Al Parker, Mead Schaeffer and Dean Cornwell, who, along with Tom Lovell, N. C. Wyeth and Harold von Schmidt would become leaders in the field.
