= Walter Biggs =

American painter

- Born: Walter Joseph Biggs; June 4, 1886; Montgomery County, Virginia
- Died: February 11, 1968 (aged 81); Roanoke, Virginia
- Occupations: Illustrator and painter
- Spouse: Mildred Armstrong (m. 1923–1937)

Walter Joseph Biggs (June 4, 1886 – February 11, 1968) was an American illustrator and fine art painter.

== Biography ==
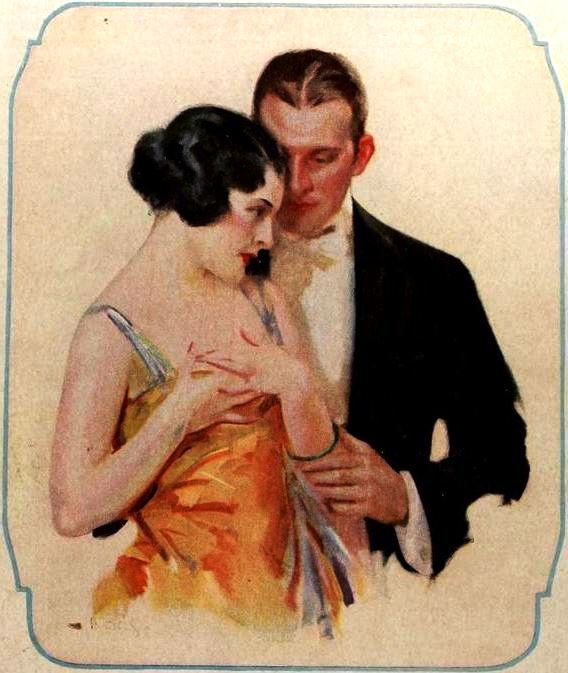
Biggs illustration used in a soap ad in 1922.

Biggs was born in Elliston, Virginia, in 1886. He studied in New York City at the New York School of Art. He was a student of Robert Henri, and some of his fellow students included Edward Hopper and Rockwell Kent. He later taught at the Art Students League and the New York School of Art. He lived in the suburban community of New Rochelle which was a well known artist colony and home to many of the top commercial illustrators of the day such as Frank and J. C. Leyendecker and Norman Rockwell. Also in residence were Al Parker, Mead Schaeffer and Dean Cornwell, who, along with Tom Lovell, N. C. Wyeth and Harold von Schmidt would become leaders in the field.

Biggs became known in the 1920s and 1930s for his illustrations for popular magazines such as the Ladies' Home Journal.

In 1944, Biggs was elected into the National Academy of Design as an Associate member, and became a full member in 1947. In 1963 he was inducted into the Society of Illustrators Hall of Fame.

Walter Biggs died February 11, 1968. An historical marker was erected at the intersection of Roanoke Boulevard and College Street, in Salem, Virginia, across from Biggs’s family home.
