= New Rochelle artist colony =

Artist colony in New Rochelle, New York, U.S.

The New Rochelle artist colony was a community of artists, actors, musicians, playwrights and writers who settled in the city of New Rochelle, New York, during the early twentieth century. By the 1920s, New Rochelle had more artists per capita than almost any city in the United States, and newspaper headlines were referring to the community as "Greenwich Village without the Greenwich."

The colony included the dance team of Vernon and Irene Castle, actor Francis Wilson, writer Augustus Thomas, and artists Robert I. Aitken, Edward Kemble, Rufus Zogbaum, Alton Tobey, and Julian Hawthorne. Some affiliated artists included Ellen Emmet Rand, Montague Castle, H. R. Stanton, F. Tolles Chamberlain, Alonzo Klaw, Herman Lambden, Sophie Schuyler Day, Martha B. Bintliff, and A. Phimister Proctor.

== Illustrators ==
The New Rochelle artist colony was best known for its number of prominent American illustrators. In the early 1920s more than fifty percent of the illustrations in the country's best-selling publications, and 90% of the illustrations in The Saturday Evening Post, were produced by artists from the city.

Norman Rockwell was a member of the community. Clyde Forsythe, who shared Frederic Remington's former studio with Rockwell early on, convinced him to submit cover ideas to the Saturday Evening Post. Rockwell later created over 320 covers over the course of his career. Forsythe also introduced Rockwell to his second wife, Mary Barstow, who was a nationally syndicated cartoonist. For Rockwell, living in New Rochelle in the 1920s in the presence of its many illustrators and artists encouraged his intuition that illustration was a worthy use of artistic talent. Among the most gratifying signs that he had indeed become a serious contender in the art world was the respect shown him by New Rochelle's coterie of famous illustrators.

Coles Phillips, a freelance illustrator, developed a signature device, the "Fade-away Girl", that appeared in popular magazines and in advertisements. He blocked in parts of the face and figure and left the rest to the imagination.

Nell Brinkley illustrated newspaper romance stories and was often called the Queen of Cartoons. Her "Brinkley Girl" became the 1920s equivalent of Charles Dana Gibson's "Gibson Girl" two decades earlier.

Most of the illustrators who lived in New Rochelle were commercially successful, designing covers and illustrations for popular magazines as well as images for advertising and cartoon strips. They were national celebrities in the days before television, as print was the way people got their information and they were acquainted with these artists on a daily basis.

Most were paid well enough to live comfortable suburban lifestyles. J. C. Leyendecker, creator of the Arrow Collar Man advertising image and frequent contributor to the Saturday Evening Post, lived in a large chateau and estate overlooking Long Island Sound. Syndicated political cartoonist Clare Briggs built the Tudor revival home 'Blue Anchor', adjacent to the golf course of the Wykagyl Country Club where he was a member. Frederic Remington, known for his drawings and paintings of the American West, lived in one of the gothic-revival homes designed by Alexander Jackson Davis on Lather's Hill.

New Rochelle's illustrators included:

- Harold Anderson
- Franklin Booth
- George Brehm
- Worth Brehm
- Clare Briggs
- Nell Brinkley
- Howard Chandler Christy
- Daniel Content
- Dean Cornwell
- Alice J. Crosby
- John Cullen Murphy
- Walter De Maris
- John Philip Falter
- Clyde Forsythe
- Charles Dana Gibson
- Irving Hansen
- Lucius W. Hitchcock
- Walter Beach Humphrey
- Herbert S. Kates
- Frank X. Leyendecker
- J. C. Leyendecker
- Tom Lovell
- Orson Byron Lowell
- Frederick Opper
- A. S. Packer
- Al Parker
- Edward Penfield
- Coles Phillips
- Charles M. Relyea
- Frederic Remington
- Norman Rockwell
- Mead Schaeffer
- Leon A. Shafer
- Remington Schuyler
- Frederick L. Stanley
- Donald Teague
- George T. Tobin
- Edmund Franklin Ward
- Revere F. Wistefuff

== New Rochelle Art Association ==
In 1912, a number of artists from the community organized the New Rochelle Art Association. The organization set formal goals among which were to “set an educational standard in the Fine Arts and promote interest in art in the community.”. The associations founding members included Norman Rockwell, J. C. Leyendecker, F. X. Leyendecker, Ernest Albert, Frederick Dana Marsh, G. Glen Newell, Orson Lowell, Remington Schuyler, Alta West Salisbury, George T. Tobin, Lucius W. Hitchcock, Edward Penfield, and A. G. Heaton.

== See also ==
- Art colony
