= Nell Brinkley =

American illustrator (1886–1944)

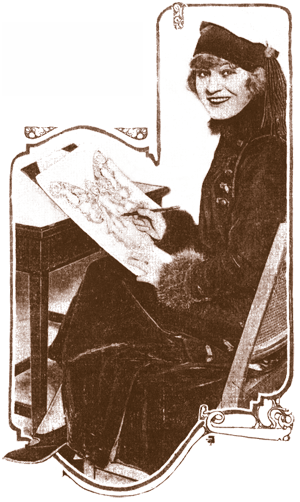
- Born: September 5, 1886; Denver, Colorado, U.S.
- Died: October 21, 1944 (aged 58); New Rochelle, New York, U.S.
- Occupations: Illustrator and comic artist
- Spouse: Bruce McRae Jr. (m. 1920; div. 1937)
- Children: Bruce McRae III
- Parent(s): Robert Serrett Brinkley and May French Brinkley
- Awards: Women Cartoonists Hall of Fame; Eisner Award Hall of Fame

Nell Brinkley (September 5, 1886 – October 21, 1944) was an American illustrator and comic artist who was sometimes referred to as the "Queen of Comics" during her nearly four-decade career working with New York newspapers and magazines. She was the creator of the Brinkley Girl, a stylish character who appeared in her comics and became a popular symbol in songs, films and theater.

== Early years ==
Nell Brinkley was born in 1886 to Robert Serrett Brinkley and May French Brinkley in Denver, Colorado, and in 1893 her family moved to the small town of Edgewater on Denver's western border, facing Sloan's Lake at Manhattan Beach. Her father Robert Brinkley would later become the mayor of Edgewater. As a small child, she drew place-setting illustrations of knobby-kneed kiddies for Mary Elitch's garden parties at Elitch Gardens. She had no formal arts training, and dropped out of high school to pursue a career in illustration. She did cover and interior illustrations for the 1906 children's book, Wally Wish and Maggie Magpie by A.U. Mayfield. She did pen-and-ink drawings for The Denver Post and the Rocky Mountain News.

== Career ==
Brinkley was scouted in 1907 by media mogul William Randolph Hearst and his editor Arthur Brisbane, who convinced her to move from Denver to Brooklyn, New York where Hearst's newspaper empire was centered. She was accompanied by her mother. She worked in Manhattan for the Journal, where she produced large detailed illustrations with commentary almost every day. Her art was featured in the prestigious magazine section, and the newspaper's circulation boomed. Brinkley later moved to New Rochelle, New York, a well known artist colony, home to many of the top commercial illustrators of the day. She soon became well known for her breezy and entertaining creations. The curly-haired everyday working-girl drawings were known as the Brinkley Girl, who soon upstaged Charles Dana Gibson's Gibson Girl. The Ziegfeld Follies (1908) used the Brinkley Girl as a theme, and three popular songs were written about her. Bloomingdale's department store featured a Nell Brinkley Day with advertisements using many of her drawings. Women emulated the hairstyles in the cartoons and purchased Nell Brinkley Hair Curlers for ten cents a card. Young girls saved her drawings, colored them and pasted them in scrapbooks. The Denver Press Club greeted her when she vacationed in Colorado in the summer of 1908. Nell was most famous for her representing "relationships between boy and girl—man and woman—Bettys and Billies". Her illustrations used the drawing of "Dan Cupid" to represent the presence of that something most people call "love".

Brinkley's reputation was also established by an early assignment to cover the sensational murder trial of Harry K. Thaw. She was assigned many interviews with the actress-wife, Evelyn Nesbit. In later years, she covered other infamous murder trials. She produced numerous courtroom illustrations printed in the Evening Journal and other Hearst newspapers.

Brinkley had been on the staff of the Journal for only three months when the new trial began. She had come after two years on the Denver Post, bringing with her a talent for pretty-girl art that had not yet been matured into delicately fine-lined art-nouveau style for which she would become famous. Brinkley christened all the pretty girls she drew "Betty," and called all the boys "Billy". Brinkley's debut came on November 26, 1907, and she was featured on a comics page that contained her illustrated panel that accompanied an article on actress Valeska Surrat. Brinkley wrote this article using her usual superlatives ("The Most Beautiful Woman I Ever Saw"), and her next day's subject was Ethel Barrymore.

After the Thaw trial, Brinkley returned to the women's page and made forays into the entertainment section with reviews of new plays and musicals. Brinkley's art was now featured in Hearst newspapers all over the country and Americans were sitting up and taking notice of this new young artist.

Brinkley wrote in the pop culture style of the early 20th century, producing breathless prose filled with run-on sentences, liberally sprinkled with dashes.

Brinkley flew with Glen Martin in his new biplane and reported the daring swoopings and the landing for her readers. Brinkley helped with War Bond drives, and she entertained and consoled those at home and the American youth abroad, during and just after World War I. She traveled to Washington, D.C. where she interviewed many young ladies who had left their homes to become defense workers.

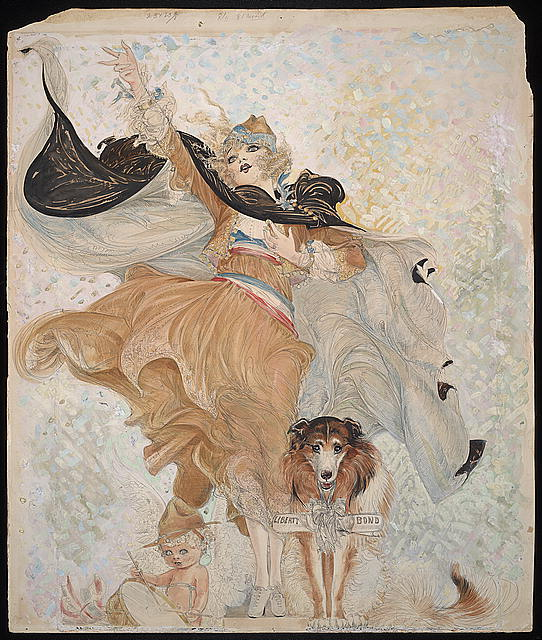
Golden Eyes with Uncle Sam by Nell Brinkley, c. 1918.

Brinkley also became known for the charming text that accompanied her stories and reporting while she worked at the Evening Journal and other publications that included Cosmopolitan, Good Housekeeping and Harper's Magazine. She produced many illustrated theatre reviews and profiles of mothers and young women in society, including later, in the 1930s First Lady Eleanor Roosevelt. Much of her writing promoted the working women of the time, and encouraged the expansion of women's rights.

Her work was distributed to newspapers internationally by King Features Syndicate and Brinkley became the most prolific and famous romantic writer-illustrator. Later, she illustrated books and produced topical multi-panel pages of art. One was collected in a 1943 anthology of comics.

By 1935, however, photography began to replace illustrations in newspapers, and she began to lose popularity.

== The Brinkley Girl ==
Brinkley was known for her idyllic designs in her artwork, and her female characters drew attention from readers. In comparison to the staid Gibson Girl stereotype established earlier by Charles Dana Gibson, the Brinkley Girl was feminine, fun-loving and more independent. Syndicated nationally, her drawing The Three Graces helped establish this character as an icon. The piece, displaying three women singing the praises of suffrage, preparedness and Americanism with regards to love of country, was one of the first to link young, attractive women with the concept of suffrage.

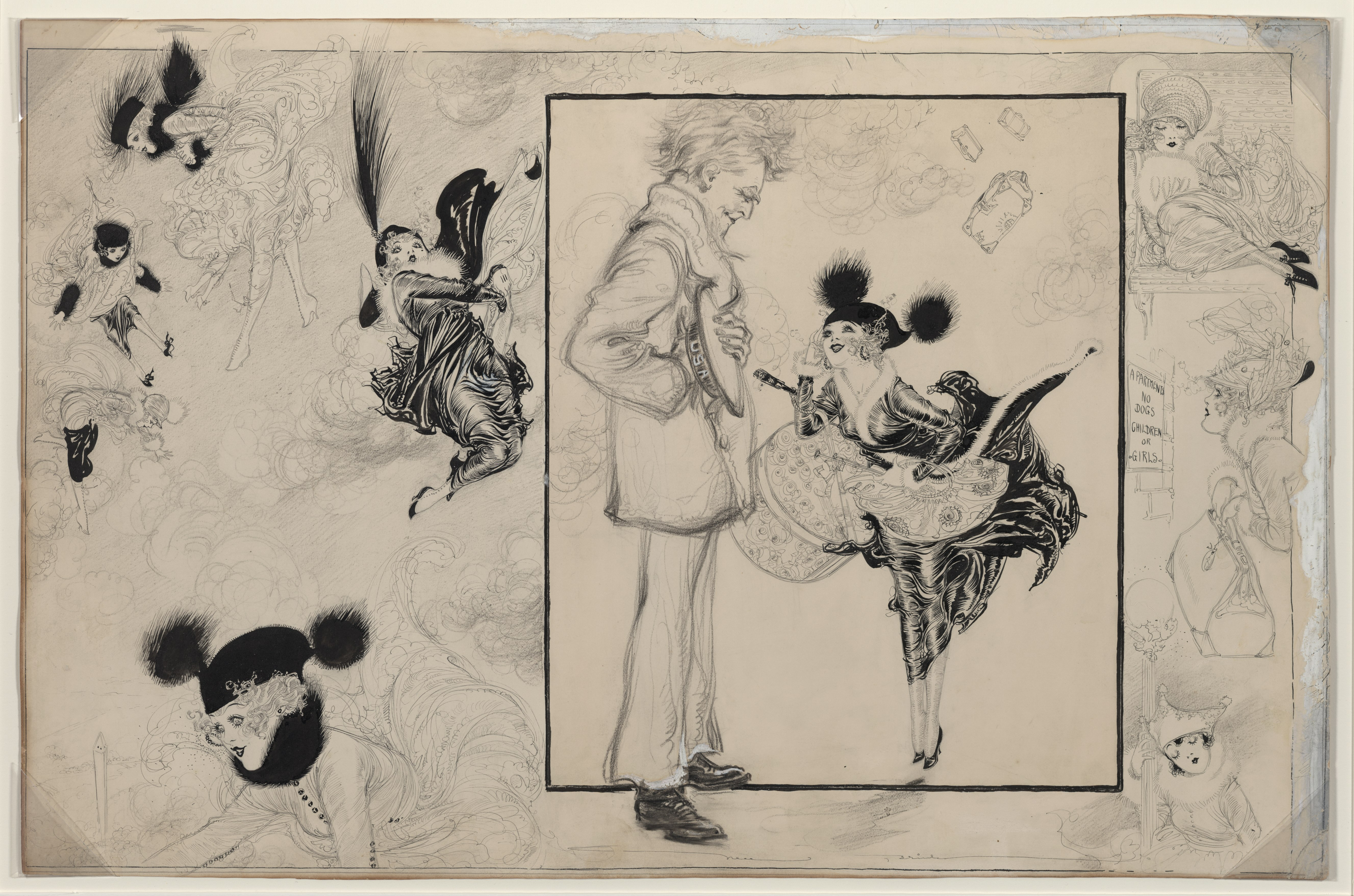
Uncle Sam's Girl Shower, by Nell Brinkley, 1917, an image using her iconic Brinkley Girl in support of working women who arrived in Washington, D.C. only to find they were denied the ability to rent apartments.

The Brinkley Girl was generally a young working woman who was often seen wearing lacy dresses and wearing her hair in curls, engaged in activities that were more independent than the general female standard. Her work was often considered to have a feminist slant.

The Brinkley Girl became a national sensation, the topic of pop songs, poetry and theater. The second Ziegfeld Follies (1908) featured a number of references to the Brinkley Girl, including a song "The Nell Brinkley Girl" by Harry B. Smith and Maurice Levi.

== Books ==
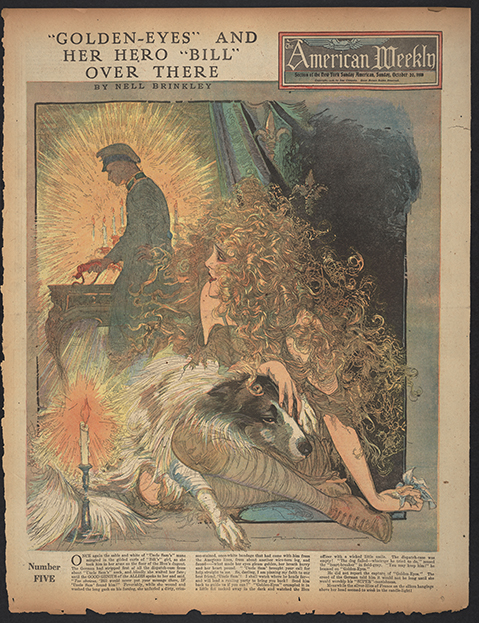
Golden Eyes, October 1918

The Brinkley Girls (Fantagraphics Books, 2009) collects Brinkley's full-page color art from 1913 to 1940; her earliest adventure series, Golden Eyes and Her Hero, Bill; her romantic series, Betty and Billy and Their Love Through the Ages; her flapper comics from the 1920s; her 1937 pulp magazine-inspired Heroines of Today and unpublished paintings, along with an introduction by the book's editor, Trina Robbins.

Her earliest series, Golden Eyes and Her Hero, Bill, is a comic chronicling the adventures of a girl known as Golden Eyes during World War I. It ran from March 1918 through February 1919 and featured full page illustrations in color. The series was renamed "Golden Eyes" and Her Hero "Bill" Over There, after a few episodes (as the narrative had shifted to France) and would keep that new name for the remaining 15 installments.

The story begins with Golden Eyes saying goodbye to her lover Bill, who is deployed to France to fight the Germans. He leaves his faithful dog "Uncle Sam" in her care, and while girl and dog try to do their part for the allies from home they're spurred into action by the discovery of a German spy in Golden Eyes' own backyard. Golden Eyes, with Uncle Sam at her side, enlists as an ambulance driver for the Red Cross, and they are briefly reunited with Bill in France before duty separates them again. Golden Eyes, the dog, and Bill are reunited and drawn apart repeatedly throughout the course of the tales. They rescue each other from capture and injury as they fight for the allies - and for their future together.

The serial is notable for its proactive heroine, patriotic underpinnings, and distinct Brinkley art style which blended elements of Art Deco and Art Nouveau into elegant, sumptuous illustrations that embodied the ideals of feminine beauty in the 1910s.

Her last published work was a Sunday series begun in 1937 entitled, Heroines of Today. This is considered Brinkley's most interesting and powerful creation. Intended to glamorize women from many walks of life, both in household work and outside it, married or single, Brinkley portrayed strong women workers like forest-fire spotters, soldiers, police detectives, a woman who acts as rescuer when saving four people from drowning, and a "jungle queen" who was left to survive on her own after her trader husband dies: she is depicted heroically continuing his business while working altruistically with indigenous people.

Her "Woman Warrior" illustrations were featured in the Heroines stories. Brinkley wrote of women in action during WWII, using machine guns and operating tanks in Soviet Russia, and in Spain. A notable story was that of Rosetta Millington of Austria, a Red Cross worker who joined the Spanish Foreign Legion during WWII disguised as a man.

== Personal life ==
Brinkley married Bruce McRae Jr., newspaperman and son of famed Broadway actor Bruce McRae, on September 7, 1920. Two years later, she gave birth to their only child, Bruce Robert McRae III on December 15, 1922. Brinkley and McRae Jr. later divorced in 1937.

In 1944, Nell Brinkley died after more than 30 years of entertaining fans from the "most read newspapers". Her death went largely unnoticed under the crush of WWII news, but the Associated Press reported she died in a New Rochelle hospital on the night of October 21, 1944, after a long illness. Brinkley, her mother and father are all buried in a cemetery in New Rochelle, New York.

== Awards ==
Brinkley was inducted into Friends of Lulu's Women Cartoonists Hall of Fame in 2008. In 2020, San Diego Comic-Con inducted Nell Brinkley into the Eisner Award Hall of Fame.

== Bibliography ==
- Collins, Lois E.; Tom J. Collins (26 December 2007). Nell Brinkley 1917 "Love Letters". Nell Brinkley 1917, 18, 19. ISBN 9781435704916.
- Collins, Lois E.; Tom J. Collins (6 January 2008). Nell Brinkley 1918 "Love Letters". Nell Brinkley 1917, 18, 19. ISBN 9781435704848.
- Collins, Lois E.; Tom J. Collins (26 December 2007). Nell Brinkley 1919 "Love Letters". Nell Brinkley 1917, 18, 19. ISBN 9781435704879.
- Trina Robbins, ed. (2009). The Brinkley Girls: The Best of Nell Brinkley's Cartoons from 1913-1940. Fantagraphics Books. ISBN 978-1-56097-970-8.
