= Walter Briggs =

Walter Briggs may refer to:

- Walter Briggs Sr. (1877–1952), owner of the Detroit Tigers and Briggs Manufacturing Company
- Walter Briggs Jr. (1912–1970), son of Walter Briggs, Sr. and owner of the Detroit Tigers
- Walter Briggs (American football) (born 1965), American football player

== See also ==
- Walter Biggs (1886–1968), American illustrator and fine art painter
