= Henry Heydenryk Jr. =

Dutch-American frame maker (1905–1994)

- Born: 1905
- Died: June 23, 1994 (aged 88–89); Mystic, Connecticut, U.S.
- Known for: Frame maker, historian, author and designer
- Scientific career
- Fields: Picture framing
- Institutions: The House of Heydenryk (Heijdenrijk)

Henry Heydenryk Jr. (1905–1994) was a Dutch American frame maker, historian, writer and designer. He was the fourth generation descendant of a family-run business, The House of Heydenryk (Heijdenrijk). Founded in Amsterdam in 1845, the company is one of the world’s oldest framing companies. The firm made and supplied reproductions and antiques to the Tate and National Gallery museums in England, the Rijksmuseum in the Netherlands and for many other important museums and private collectors including Baron Thyssen-Bornemisza and members of the Rothschild family.

== The House of Heydenryk ==
In 1936, Henry Heydenryk Jr. brought the firm to New York City in the United States where he would revolutionize the framing industry by creating new designs and finishes. He supplied both hand crafted frames and antiques to major artists, collectors and museums in the US and Europe. He would also author two books on the art and history of picture framing, The Art and History of Frames: An Inquiry into the Enhancement of Paintings in 1963 and The Right Frame: A Consideration of the Right and Wrong Methods of Framing Pictures in 1964.

In the beginning, the American House of Heydenryk was a franchise of the Dutch firm, making period reproductions for artists, galleries and museums. Heydenryk Jr. would eventually branch out from traditional frame making and design his own mouldings and finishes for contemporary artists in Manhattan under the name The House of Heydenryk Jr. Inc.

== Frame Designs for Important 20th- Century American and European Artists ==
Henry Heydenryk Jr. is credited with introducing and popularizing the wormy chestnut frame in 1938, using wood from trees destroyed by blight and applying new finishes, painted, scraped and stained, as an alternative to traditional gilt and smooth surfaces. In 1937, Heydenryk befriended the American Modernist painter Marsden Hartley after his dealer Alfred Stieglitz closed his gallery. He designed and loaned frames for Hartley's first exhibition with the Hudson Walker gallery in 1938. The show was an immediate success and Hartley would continue to use Heydenryk’s designs for all of his exhibits until his death in 1943.

In addition to Hartley, The House of Heydenryk Jr. worked directly with and made frames for other American Modernist artists including Georgia O'Keeffe, John Marin, Max Weber, Charles Sheeler, Jacob Lawrence, Stuart Davis, Romare Bearden, Milton Avery, Yasuo Kuniyoshi and Abraham Walkowitz.

Heydenryk also produced and sold frames directly to such American painters as Edward Hopper, Andrew Wyeth, John Sloan, Norman Rockwell, Raphael Soyer, Moses Soyer and John Carlton Atherton. He framed the early exhibitions of such Abstract Expressionists as Robert Motherwell, Adolph Gottlieb and William Baziotes.

Heydenryk’s influence was not limited to American artists. He framed works by Pablo Picasso for the New York galleries of European art dealers Paul Rosenberg, Klaus Perls and Pierre Matisse as well as Picasso’s American art dealer/agent, Samuel Kootz. In 1947, the first post war exhibition of Picasso’s work in the US was presented in Heydenryk frames.

Henry Heydenryk Jr. had a long relationship with the Spanish Surrealist Salvador Dalí from the 1940s through the 1960s. In collaboration with Dalí and the Argentine jeweler Carlos Alemany, Heydenryk created frames for a traveling exhibition of Dalí- designed jewels sponsored by the Owen Cheatham Foundation.

Other painters who framed directly with Heydenryk include Fernand Léger, Yaacov Agam, Moise Kisling, David Burliuk, Reuven Rubin, Philip Evergood and Joseph Solman as well as the portrait photographers Yousuf Karsh and Richard Avedon.

== Museum and Interior Design Work ==
The House of Heydenryk supplied both new and period frames to nearly every major US museum including the Museum of Fine Arts in Boston, Philadelphia Museum of Art, Metropolitan Museum of Art in New York, Frick Collection, Whitney Museum of American Art, Baltimore Museum of Art, Art Institute of Chicago, Corcoran Gallery of Art, Detroit Institute of Arts, St. Louis Art Museum, Kimbell Art Museum, Norton Simon Museum, Smithsonian Institution and Cleveland Museum of Art as well as leading auction houses such as Sotheby's and Christie's.

Henry Heydenryk Jr. worked with The Museum Of Modern Art’s co-founder Mary Quinn Sullivan, the director Alfred H. Barr Jr. and the senior curator Dorothy Canning Miller and framed many major paintings in the collection. In the 1970s, he was appointed the official frame consultant to The National Gallery of Art, providing frames for works dating from the early Renaissance to the 20th century.

In the field of architecture and interior design, Heydenryk designed frames for McKim, Mead & White, William Pahlmann, Samuel Marx, Albert Hadley and Sister Parish, working with their firm Parish Hadley on the Kennedy White House project. Such legendary Hollywood icons of style as Marlene Dietrich, Greta Garbo, Ginger Rogers and Lauren Bacall all came to Heydenryk for his advice on framing. Katharine Hepburn was a special client and Heydenryk named a frame after her in honor of their long friendship.

== Books ==
In 1963, Heydenryk wrote The Art and History of Frames: An Inquiry into the Enhancement of Paintings, the first mainstream reference book on the subject. Mr. Heydenryk followed this with The Right Frame: A Consideration of the Right and Wrong Methods of Framing Pictures in 1964, which dealt with the aesthetics of choosing the right frame for artwork. He promoted the book by giving extensive lecture tours, appearing at museums across the country and on television programs such as The Today Show.

== Death ==
On June 23, 1994, Henry Heydenryk Jr. died at The Mary Elizabeth Nursing Home in Mystic, Connecticut. The New York Times paid tribute to his many accomplishments and called him "the concertmaster of his trade." He was succeeded as president of The House of Heydenryk in 1986 by Charles Schreiber and in 2004 by David Mandel. The current firm is located in the Starrett-Lehigh Building in Chelsea, New York City.
