= Harold von Schmidt =

American artist

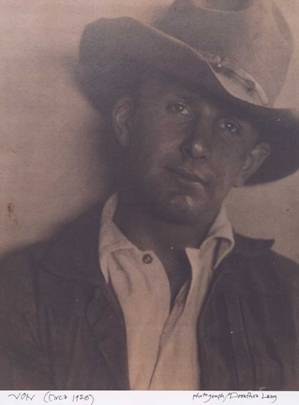
Harold von Schmidt in 1920

Harold von Schmidt (May 19, 1893 – June 3, 1982) was an American illustrator, who specialized in magazine interior illustrations.

== Early life ==
Born in Alameda, California, in 1893, he was orphaned at the age of five. After a year in an orphanage, he lived with his Aunt Lily Von Schmidt, an artist in her own right, and her second husband, Major Charles Lee Tilden, who had been a forty-niner, and founder of Tilden Park in Alameda County. As a youth, von Schmidt worked as a cowhand and a construction worker. In 1920 and 1924, he was on the United States Olympic Rugby team, along with his cousin Charles Lee Tilden Jr. Although the United States team won the gold medal both years, von Schmidt did not play in the only game in 1920, and was sidelined by an injury in the final practice in 1924.

== Career ==
Von Schmidt began his art studies at the California School of Arts and Crafts while he was still in high school. In 1924, he entered the Grand Central School of Art in New York City. He moved to the suburban community of New Rochelle which was a well-known artist colony and home to many of the top commercial illustrators of the day such as Frank and J. C. Leyendecker and Norman Rockwell. Also in residence were Al Parker, Mead Schaeffer and Dean Cornwell, who, along with Tom Lovell and N. C. Wyeth would become leaders in the field.

He later married and moved to Westport, Connecticut.

Harold von Schmidt's work appeared primarily in magazines like Collier's Weekly, Cosmopolitan, Liberty, The Saturday Evening Post, and Sunset. Although he preferred magazine work and illustrated few books, he spent two years preparing sixty illustrations for a deluxe edition of Willa Cather's Death Comes for the Archbishop. In 1948, he was recruited by Albert Dorne to be one of the founding faculty for the Famous Artists School. He was awarded the first gold medal by the trustees of the National Cowboy Hall of Fame in 1968.

== Death ==
Harold died on June 3, 1982, in Westport, Connecticut.

== Family ==
Harold's son Eric Von Schmidt was a well-known singer-songwriter associated with Bob Dylan. Harold had 3 children, a daughter Joan from his first marriage and sons Peter and Eric from his second marriage.
