= Edmund Franklin Ward =

American illustrator (1892-1990)

Edmund F. Ward
- Born: Edmund Franklin Ward; January 3, 1892; White Plains, New York, United States
- Died: December 14, 1990 (aged 98)
- Known for: Illustration, painting

Edmund Franklin Ward (January 3, 1892 – December 14, 1990) was an American illustrator who illustrated for the Saturday Evening Post and did his first illustrations for the magazine before turning age 20. He had a successful career as an illustrator of works that ranged in style and subject matter from dark tonalist in oils to humorous in wash and watercolor. For many years he illustrated the Alexander Botts and Assistant District Attorney Doowinkle stories for the Saturday Evening Post.

Ward studied at the Art Students League in the same class as Norman Rockwell. The two students became friends, and shared a studio in the attic of a Manhattan brownstone. Among his teachers were Edward Dufner, George Bridgman and Thomas Fogarty. He later moved to the Manhattan suburb of New Rochelle, a well known artist colony and home to many of the top commercial illustrators of the day including his friend Norman Rockwell. At the time more than fifty percent of the illustrations in the country’s leading publications were done by artists from New Rochelle. He spent his professional career in White Plains, where he painted a mural for the Federal Building. He was a longtime member of the Salmagundi Club, the Guild of Free Lance Artists, and was a member of the Society of Illustrators.

== Gallery ==
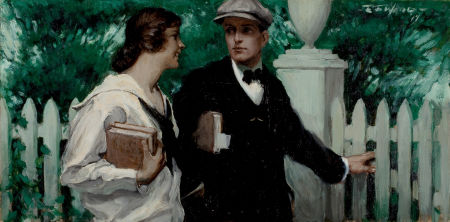
The Lost Emblem, Woman's Home Companion magazine story illustration August 4, 1917 (1917) Oil on board, 13 inch. by 26 inch.

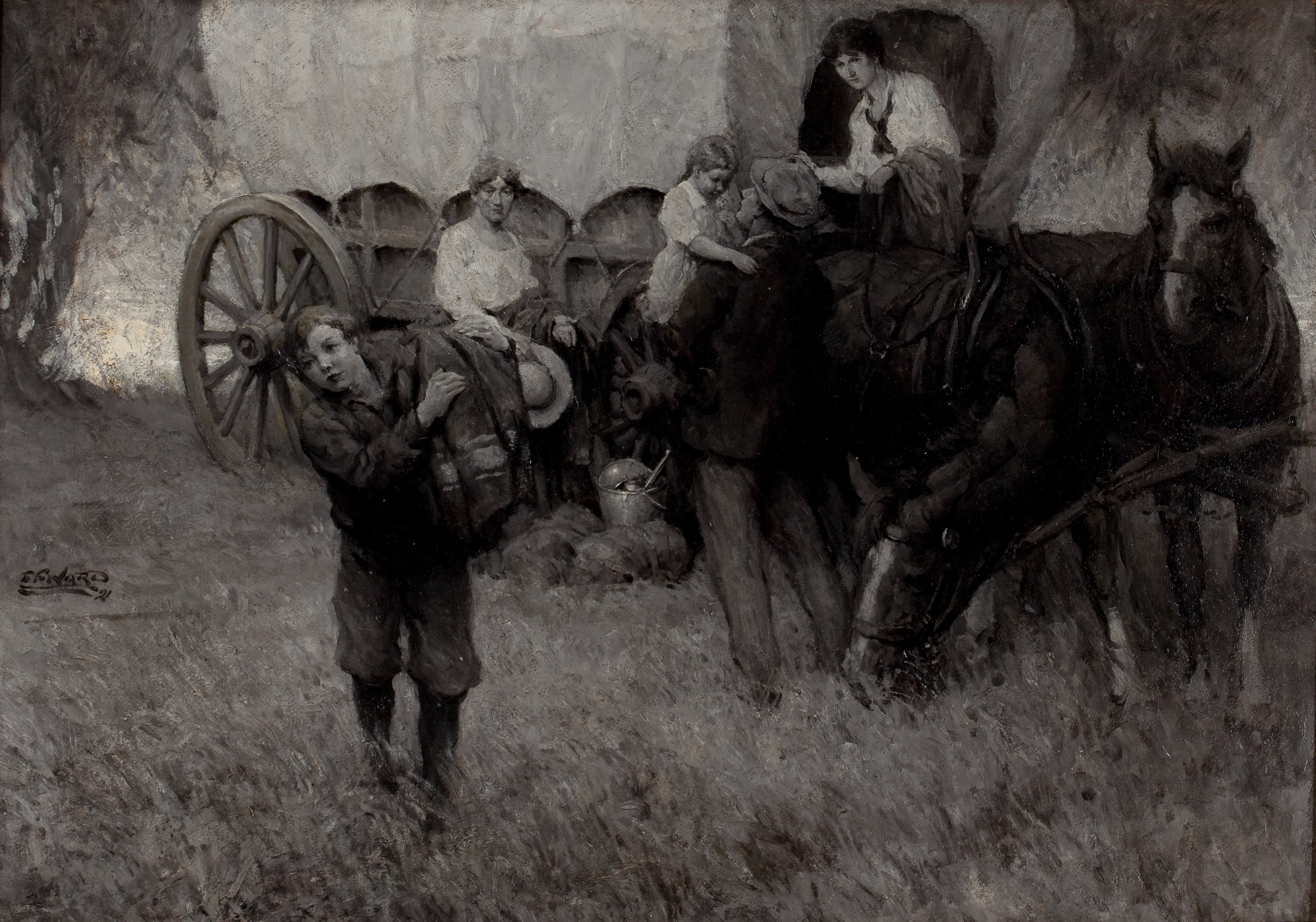
The Prairie Child, story illustration (1921) Oil on board, 24 inch. by 34.25 inch.

Immediate Jewel Part III, Story Illustration (1920) Oil on board, 29.5 inch. by 16.5 inch.

The Engagement (1921) Oil on board, 28 inch. x 39.5 inch.

Egyptian Scene (1923) Oil on board. 23 inch. by 44 inch.
