= Famous Artists School =

Art school based in Wilton, Connecticut

- Company type: Subsidiary
- Industry: Education
- Genre: Art
- Founded: 1948
- Founder: Albert Dorne
- Headquarters: Wilton, Connecticut
- Key people: Norman Rockwell
- Parent: Cortina Learning International
- Website: ArtHomeStudy.com

Robert Fawcett illustrated this cover for Famous Artists Magazine (Spring 1959).

Famous Artists School is an art correspondence course institution, in operation since 1948. The school was founded by members of the New York Society of Illustrators, principally Albert Dorne and Norman Rockwell.

== History ==
The Famous Artists School was founded in 1948 in Westport, Connecticut, U.S.A. The idea was conceived by members of the New York Society of Illustrators (SOI), but due to the Society's legal status, could not be operated by it. SOI member Albert Dorne led the initiative to set up a separate entity, and recruited the support of Norman Rockwell, who was also an SOI member. For the founding faculty, Dorne recruited John Carlton Atherton, Austin Briggs, Stevan Dohanos, Robert Fawcett, Peter Helck, Fred Ludekens, Al Parker, Norman Rockwell, Ben Stahl, Harold von Schmidt, Jon Whitcomb, and Dong Kingman.

By 1960, annual revenue of $7 million was eight times the sales of 1950. In the 1960s, the growth continued with the addition of Famous Photographers and an especially popular course, Famous Writers. European sales grew rapidly. By 1967, one officer said "we will soon have an empire on which the sun never sets." But acquisitions unrelated to art swelled the company's indebtedness, and a savage article by Jessica Mitford ripped Famous Writers for deceptive advertising and overblown promises. In 1972 the company filed for bankruptcy.

The Famous Artists School was acquired by Cortina Learning International of Wilton, Connecticut, in 1981.

In 2014 the archives were donated to the Norman Rockwell Museum.

According to a message displayed on the school's website, the school closed as of December 31, 2016. Textbooks are still offered for sale.

== Original courses ==
The original course offered in 1948 was Illustration & Design, with Painting and Cartooning added in the 1950s. The Painting and Illustration & Design courses, which are still offered, consisted of 24 lessons, with a new lesson mailed to the student upon completion of the previous lesson.

The original 1948 price for the three-year course was $200, payable at once or in monthly installments, and veterans could use the GI Bill. By the 1950s the price was $300, plus an estimated $11.55 for basic oil painting supplies.

== See also ==
- Art Instruction, Inc.
- Art school
- Famous Writers School
