= Peter Helck =

American illustrator (1893–1988)

Peter Helck (June 17, 1893 – April 22, 1988) was an American illustrator who specialized in depicting racecars. Helck estimated that he had produced more than 600 sketches, drawings and paintings during his career.

== Biography ==
Helck was born on June 17, 1893 in Manhattan, New York. He developed an interest in automobiles at a young age, and as a boy caught rides with the racing driver who tested Simplex cars. Helck attended the 1906 Vanderbilt Cup, held on Long Island.

Helck studied art in New York City, where he could observe the new automobiles displayed in showrooms. His first sale was to the Brighton Beach Motordrome, and he was soon receiving commissions from the Sheepshead Bay Speedway.

Helck worked for many of the major automobile magazines, in particular The Autocar; work for which brought him to England, and to major races in France and Italy. During the 1930s Helck was commissioned by the Sinclair Oil Company to produce a large format road map. This map did much to build Sinclair's reputation and to promote driving for pleasure.

During the mid-1940s, Helck was commissioned by Esquire magazine to create eight paintings depicting early motor racing. These paintings did much to further interest in the old car hobby.

In 1941, Helck acquired the famous Locomobile Old 16 racecar which George Robertson had driven to victory in the 1908 Vanderbilt Cup, the first American-made car to win a race against international competition. Helck kept the car in its original paint. Old 16 was given to Helck's son Jerry, who later sold it to the Henry Ford Museum. In 1945, Helck was elected into the National Academy of Design as an Associate member, and became a full Academician in 1950.

Helck died on April 22, 1988 in Boston Corner, New York.

== Legacy ==
Helck was one of the founding faculty for the Famous Artists School. He also wrote and illustrated many articles, along with two books, The Checkered Flag and Great Auto Races.
