= Gibson Girl =

Personified feminine ideal created by artist Charles Gibson

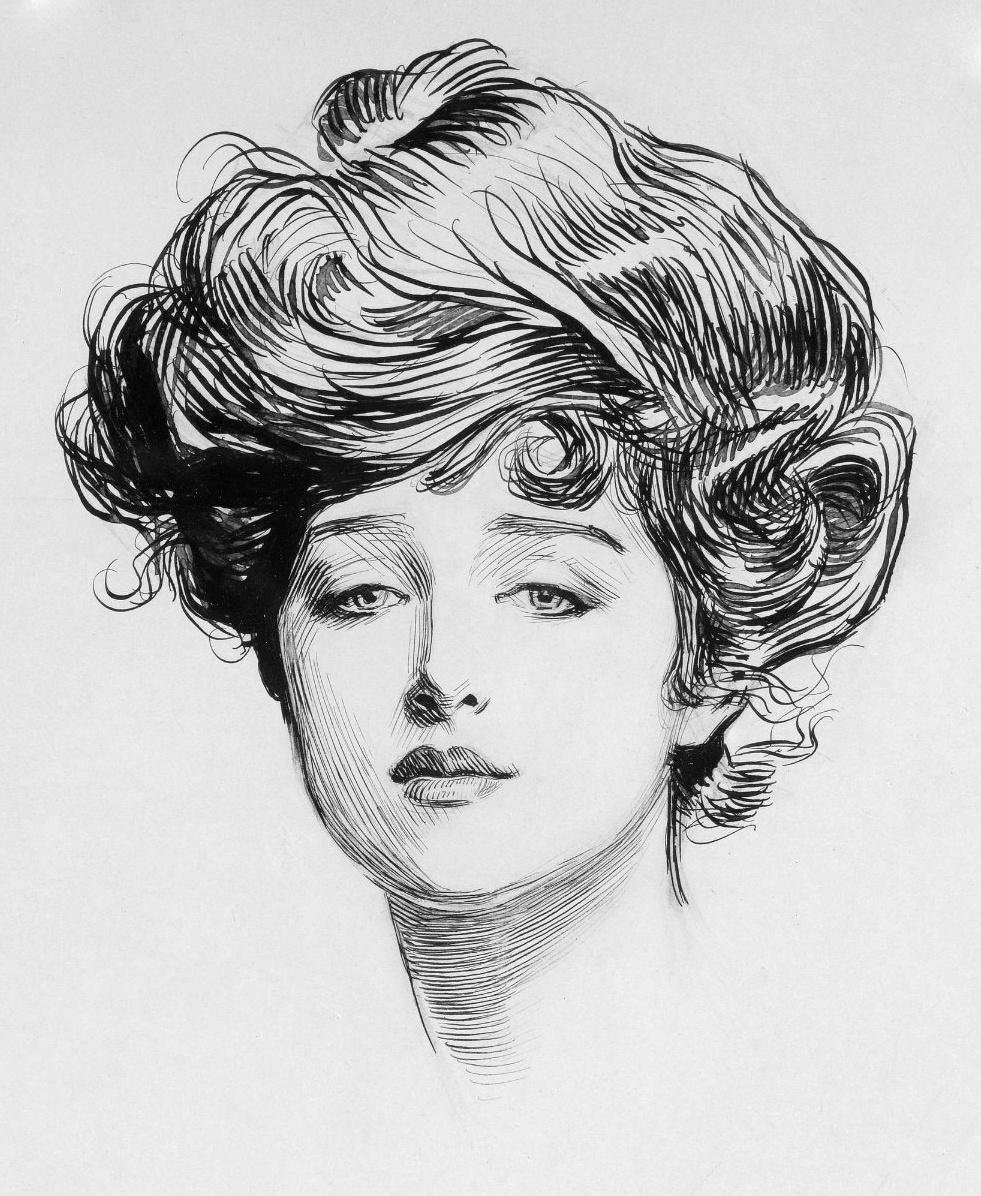
An iconic Gibson Girl portrait by Charles Dana Gibson, circa 1891

The Gibson Girl was the archetypal personification of the feminine ideal of physical attractiveness as portrayed by the pen-and-ink illustrations of artist Charles Dana Gibson during a 20-year period that spanned the late Gilded Age and Progressive Era in the United States, from around the 1890s to the 1920s. The character came to embody the concept of the New Woman and became iconic in the early 20th century.

== History ==
Gibson illustration for Collier's Weekly, July 4, 1903 ("The Weaker Sex II")

The Gibson Girl character was created by Charles Dana Gibson in the 1890s for advertisements. During this period, the United States saw large-scale industrial development as working-class people migrated to cities, effectively transforming the country from an agricultural economy into an industrial one. Single women began to increasingly join the workforce and gain educations, creating the "New Woman", a feminist ideal of an independent woman capable of personal autonomy and participation in wider society.

The character was a representation of ideal beauty and the New Woman, being simultaneously refined and beautiful but also athletic and self-emancipated and able to work. She was always portrayed in stylish attire in line with the fashion of the period, including stiff collars, full hairstyles, a thick waist, and a flattened bust and hips. As time progressed, her design began incorporating a stiffer and more columnar silhouette. Although she had large hips, she was not depicted as vulgar or lewd as previous depictions of women with those proportions had been. She was characterized as effortlessly beautiful and self-assured.

Depictions of the Gibson Girl often featured her engaging in athletic activities such as bicycling, swimming, riding horses, and playing sports such as tennis and golf. Charles Gibson also depicted her engaging in arts such as music and illustration as well as participating in jury alongside men. These depictions embodied the Gibson Girl as a woman in an increasingly feminist society.

The character came to be associated with feminist political causes, especially women's suffrage, and faced fierce backlash. Popular media often depicted the Gibson Woman as masculine and unattractive due to her association with feminist politics. Charles Gibson himself used the character to criticize the women's suffrage movement in an illustration called "A Suffragette Husband" depicting a wife turning her back on her husband. Despite this, many women of the period considered the character to be aspirational and inspiring. Feminist writer Charlotte Perkins Gilman considered the Gibson Girl to represent women being "braver, stronger, more healthful and skillful and able and free, more human in all ways."

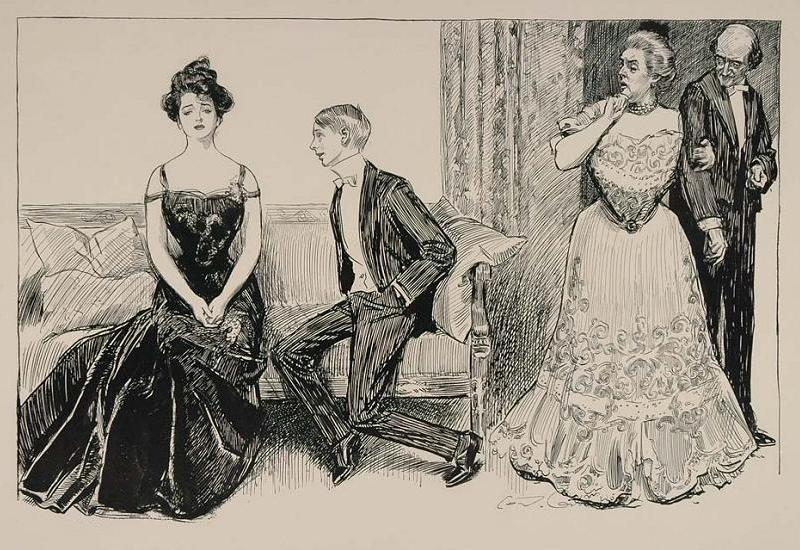
"The Crush" (1901)

Charles Gibson depicted the Gibson Girl exclusively as white, reflecting his views of the United States as a white nation and his eugenicist ideology. In a 1910 interview, he said, "Why should it not be the fittest in the form and features, as well as in the mind and muscle, which survives? And where should that fittest be in evidence most strikingly? In the United States, of course." He also claimed that respect for women was unique to white Americans, and that "The savage does not think his woman beautiful. He thinks them useful like his other beasts of burden." Despite this, the aesthetics of the Gibson Girl were adopted by some black Americans such as Margaret Murray Washington, who was described in 1901 as having "a poise of the head like a Gibson girl".

Many women posed for Gibson Girl-style illustrations, including Gibson's wife, Irene Langhorne, who may have been the original model, and was a sister of Viscountess Nancy (Langhorne) Astor. Other models included Mabel Normand, Evelyn Nesbit, Minnie Clark, and Clara B. Fayette. The most famous Gibson Girl was probably the American-British stage actress, Camille Clifford, whose high coiffure and long, elegant gowns that wrapped around her hourglass figure and tightly corseted wasp waist defined the style.

Gibson's fictional images of her published in newspapers and magazines during the Progressive Era were extremely popular. By the end of the 1920s, however, the Gibson Girl beauty standard had faded and been replaced by the flapper style. The image was not forgotten, however. The USAAF World War II-era SCR-578, and the similar post-war AN/CRT-3 survival radio transmitters carried by aircraft on over-water operations, were given the nickname "Gibson Girl" because of their "hourglass" shape; this allowed them to be held securely between the thighs whilst the generator handle was turned.

== See also ==
- Arrow Collar Man
- It girl
- Corset controversy
- Flapper
- Gibson (cocktail)
- Nell Brinkley
- Pompadour (hairstyle)
