= Charles Dana Gibson =

American artist, illustrator, and publisher (1867–1944)

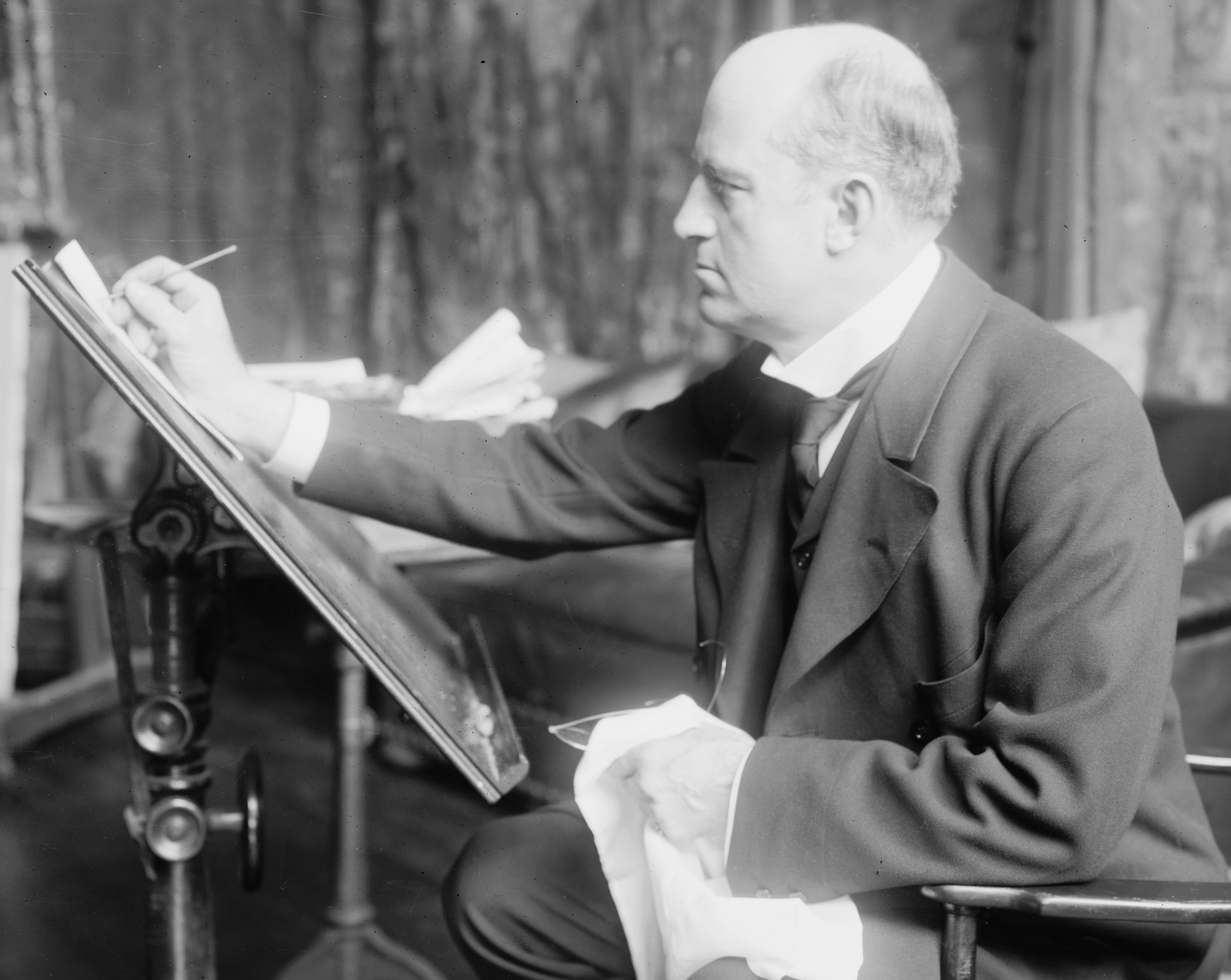
- Gibson c. 1900
- Born: September 14, 1867; Roxbury, Massachusetts, U.S.
- Died: December 23, 1944 (aged 77); Manhattan, New York City, New York, U.S.
- Education: Art Students League of New York
- Known for: Illustration
- Notable work: Gibson Girl series
- Spouse: Irene Langhorne (m. 1895)

Charles Dana Gibson (September 14, 1867 – December 23, 1944) was an American illustrator who created the Gibson Girl, a character that represented American woman at the turn of the 20th century.

He published his illustrations in Life magazine and other major national publications for more than 30 years, becoming editor in 1918 and later owner of the general interest magazine.

== Early life ==
Gibson was born in Roxbury, Massachusetts, on September 14, 1867 to Josephine Elizabeth (née Lovett) and Charles DeWolf Gibson. He had five siblings.

His great-great-great-grandfather was the lawyer Richard Dana (1700–1772). The line continued through his daughter, Lydia Trowbridge Dana (1755–1808); her daughter, Frances Maria Hastings (1792–1872); and her son, Charles Dana Gibson (1816–1867), who was his paternal grandfather and namesake.

He was also a descendant of U.S. Senators James DeWolf and William Bradford.

A talented youth with an early interest in art, Gibson was enrolled by his parents in New York City's Art Students League, where he studied for two years.

== Career ==
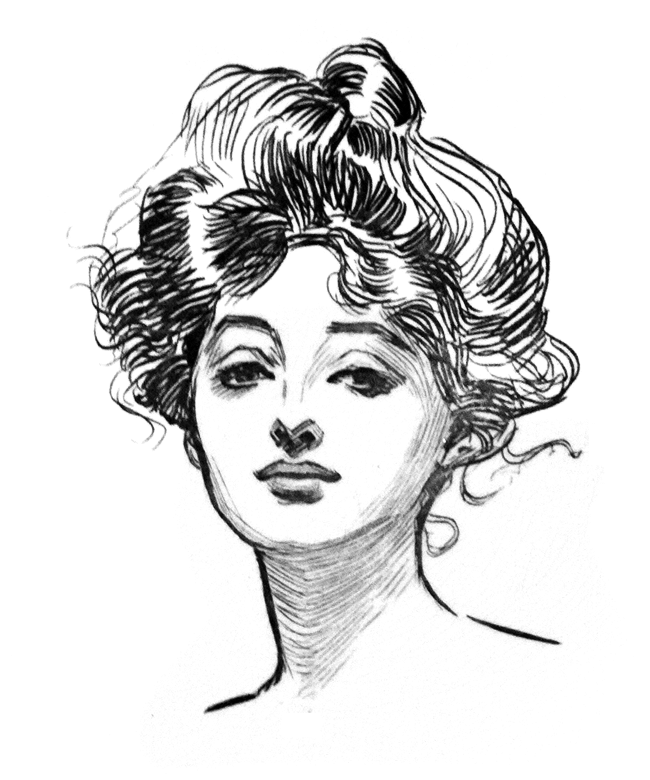
Gibson Girl, created 1898

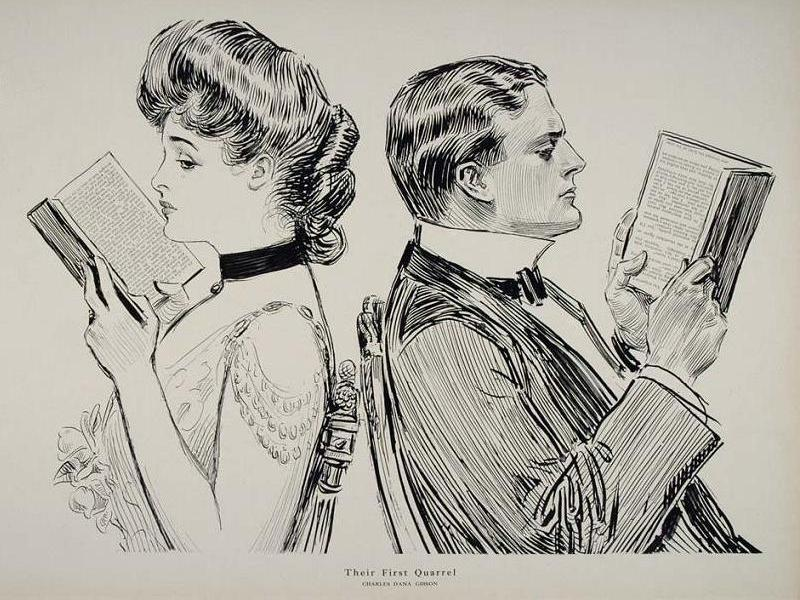
Their First Quarrel, 1914

Peddling his pen-and-ink sketches, Gibson sold his first work in 1886 to Life magazine, founded by John Ames Mitchell and Andrew Miller. It featured general interest articles, humor, illustrations, and cartoons. His works appeared weekly in the popular national magazine for more than 30 years. He built a wider reputation, with his drawings being featured in New York publications, including Harper's Weekly, Scribner's and Collier's. His illustrated books include the 1898 editions of Anthony Hope's The Prisoner of Zenda and its sequel Rupert of Hentzau as well as Richard Harding Davis' Gallegher and Other Stories.

Contrary to popular legend, Gibson’s wife and her elegant Langhorne sisters did not inspire his famous Gibson Girls. The first Gibson Girl appeared in 1890, more than two years before Gibson met the Langhorne family. In later years, however, many of his friends and relatives modeled for his illustrations.

After the death of John Ames Mitchell in 1918, Gibson became editor of Life and later took over as owner of the magazine. As the popularity of the Gibson Girl faded after World War I, Gibson took to working in oils for his own pleasure. In 1918, he was elected into the National Academy of Design as an Associate member, and became a full Academician in 1932.

He retired in 1936, the same year Scribner's published his biography, Portrait of an Era as Drawn by C. D. Gibson: A Biography by Fairfax Downey. At the time of his death in 1944, he was considered "the most celebrated pen-and-ink artist of his time as well as a painter applauded by the critics of his later work."

== Personal life ==
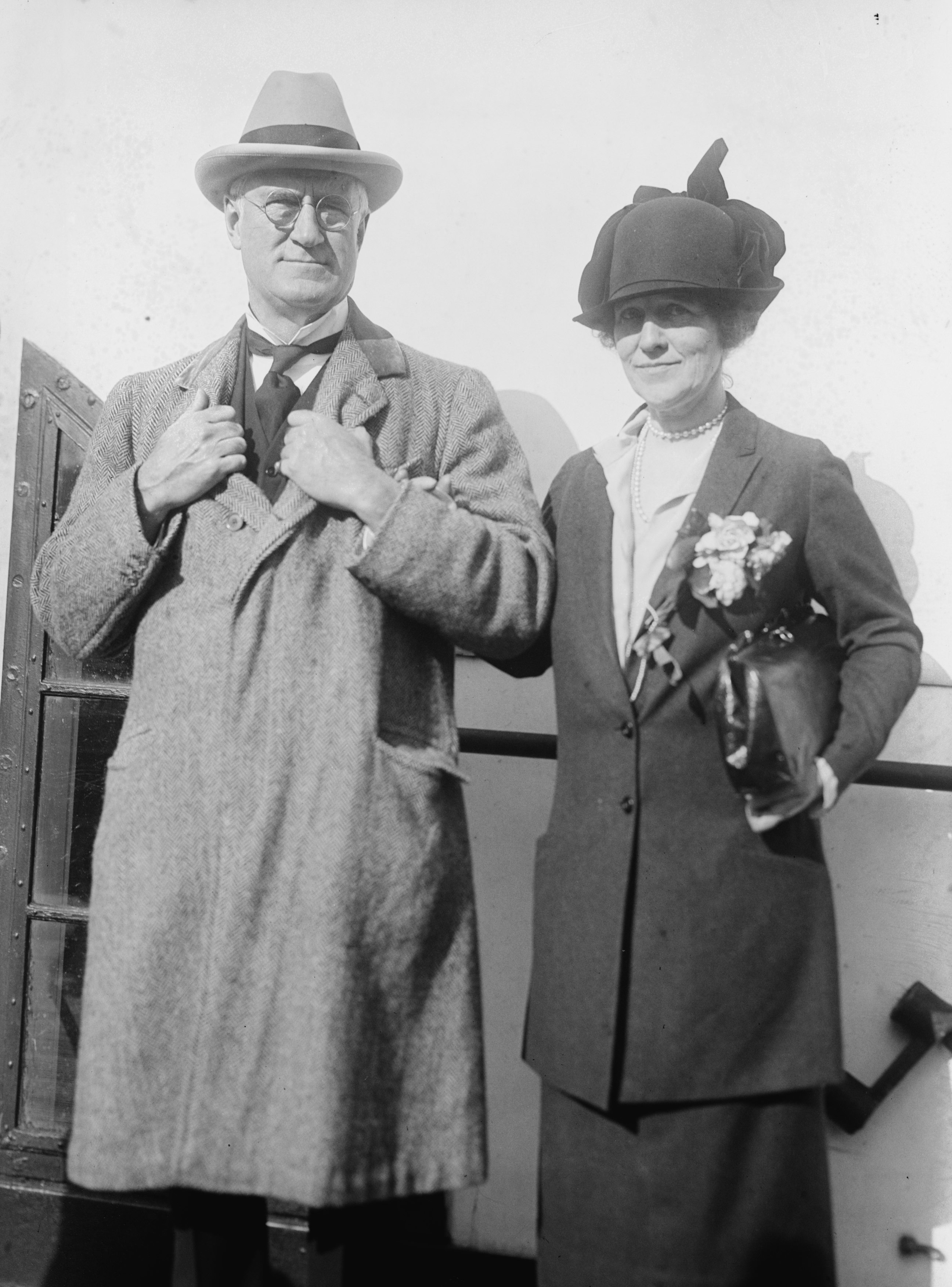
Gibson and his wife, Irene Langhorne, c. 1925

On November 7, 1895, Gibson was married to Irene Langhorne (1873–1956), a daughter of railroad industrialist Chiswell Langhorne. Irene was born in Danville, Virginia, and was one of five sisters, all noted for their beauty, including Nancy Astor, Viscountess Astor, the first woman to serve as a Member of Parliament (MP) in the House of Commons of the United Kingdom. Irene and Charles were the parents of two children:

- Irene Langhorne Gibson (1897–1973), who married George Browne Post III (1890–1952), a grandson of architect George B. Post, in 1916. They divorced and she married real estate developer John Josiah Emery (1898–1976) in 1926.
- Langhorne Gibson (1899–1982), who married Marion Taylor (1902–1960), a daughter of Moses Taylor V and granddaughter of Heber R. Bishop in 1922. He later married Parthenia Burke Ross (1911–1998) in 1936.

For part of his career, Gibson lived in New Rochelle, New York, a art colony, among actors, writers and artists of the period. Gibson also owned an island off Islesboro, Maine which came to be known as 700 Acre Island; he and his wife spent an increasing amount of time there through the years.

Gibson died of a heart ailment in 1944, aged 77, at 127 East 73rd Street, his home in the Upper East Side neighborhood of Manhattan in New York City. After a private funeral service at the Gibson home in New York, he was interred at Mount Auburn Cemetery in Cambridge, Massachusetts.

== Work ==
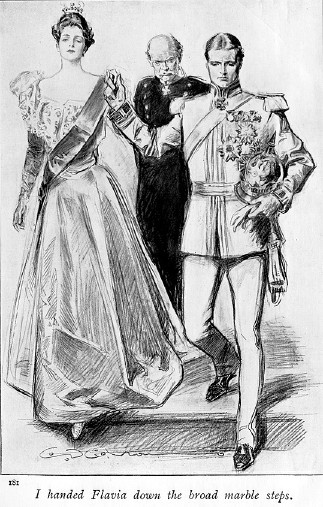
Frontispiece to The Prisoner of Zenda, 1898

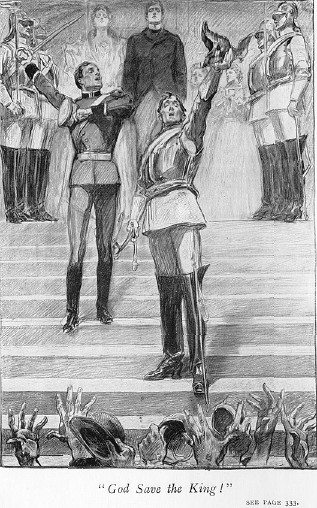
Illustration from Rupert of Hentzau, 1898

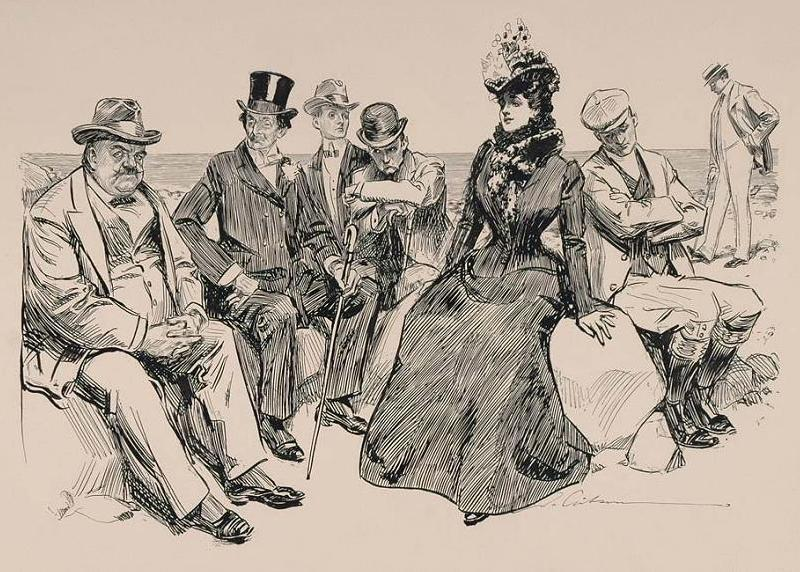
At the Beach, 1901

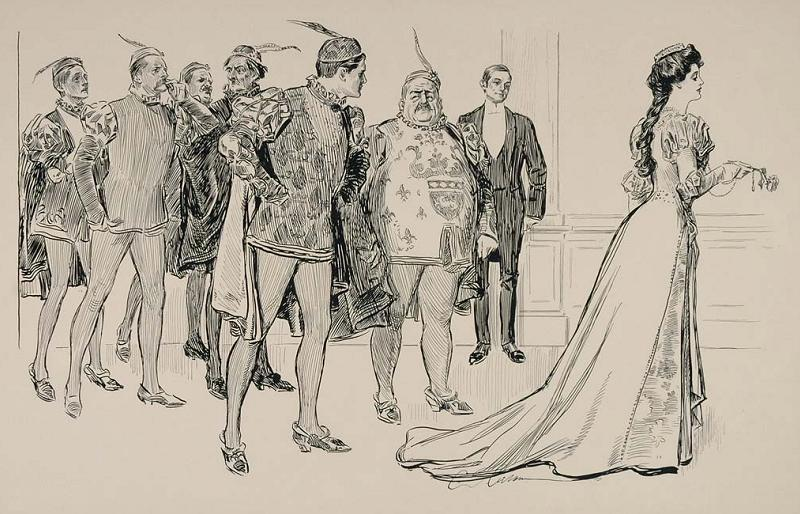
Fancy Dress, 1901

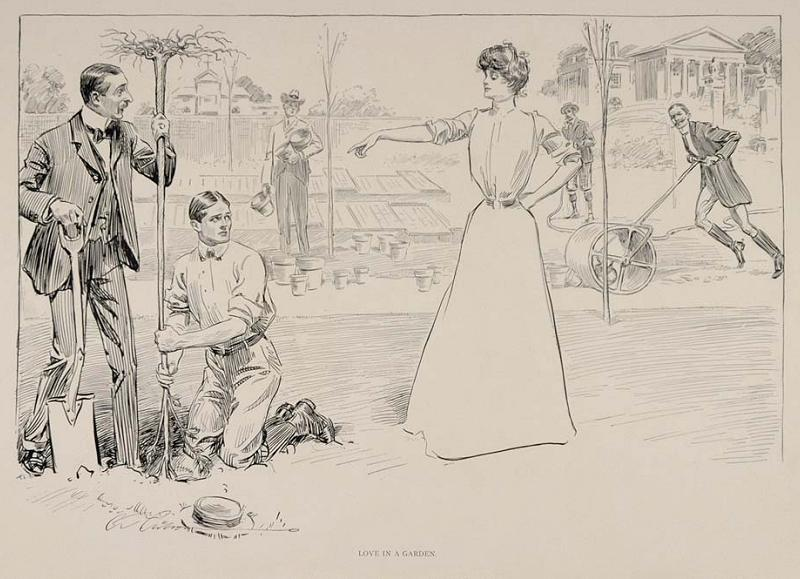
Love in a Garden, 1901

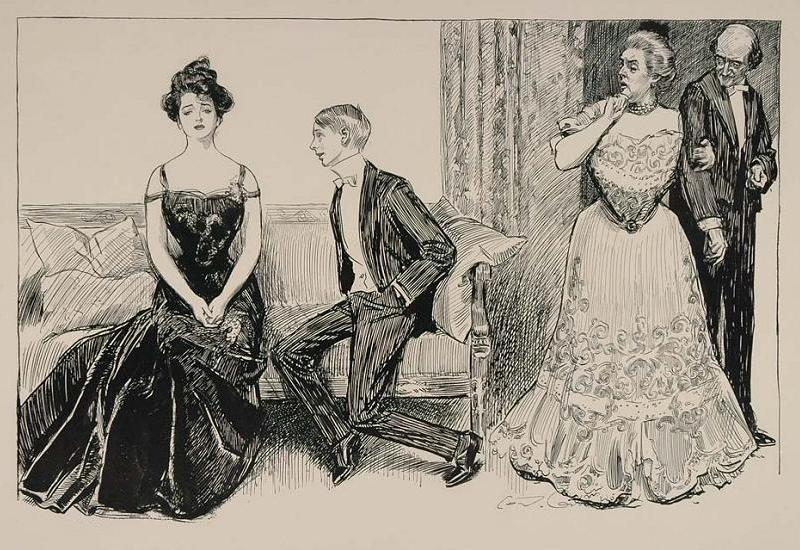
The Crush, 1901

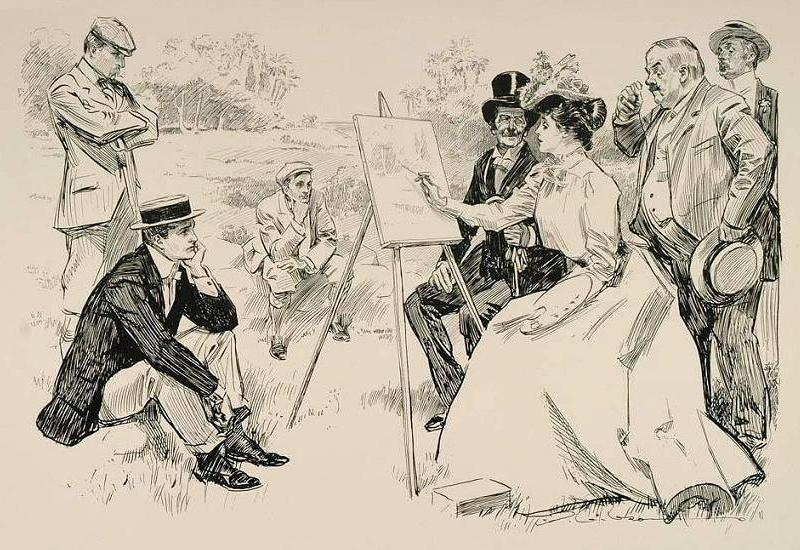
Art Lesson, 1901

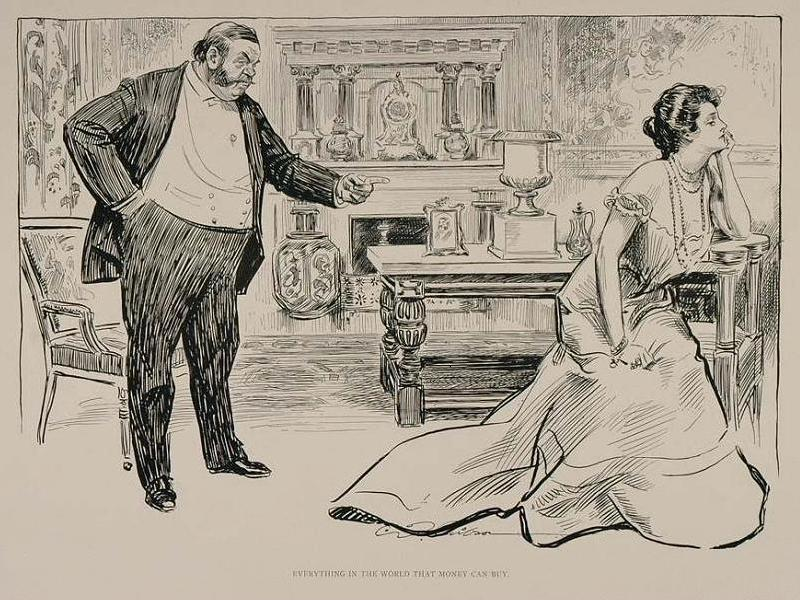
Everything in the World That Money Can Buy, 1901

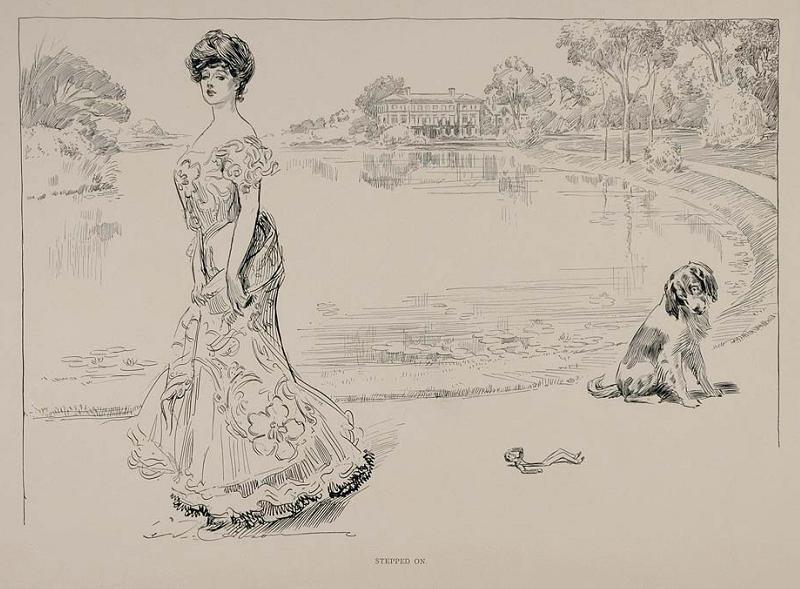
Stepped On, 1901

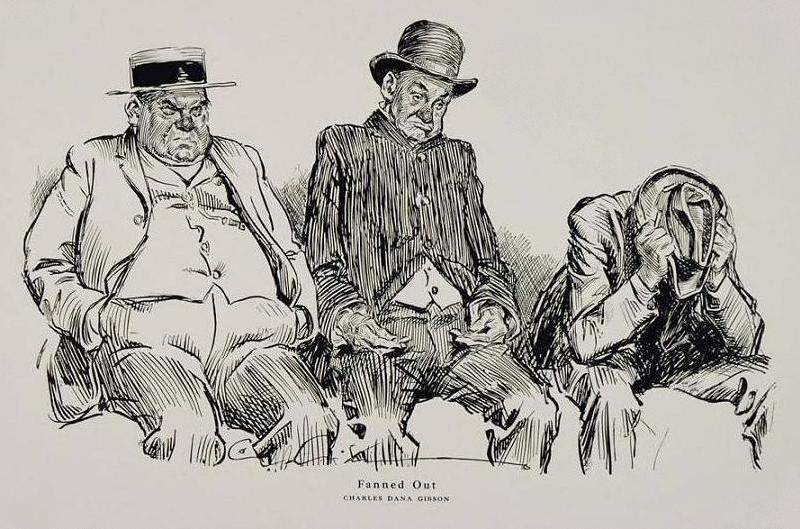
Fanned Out, 1914

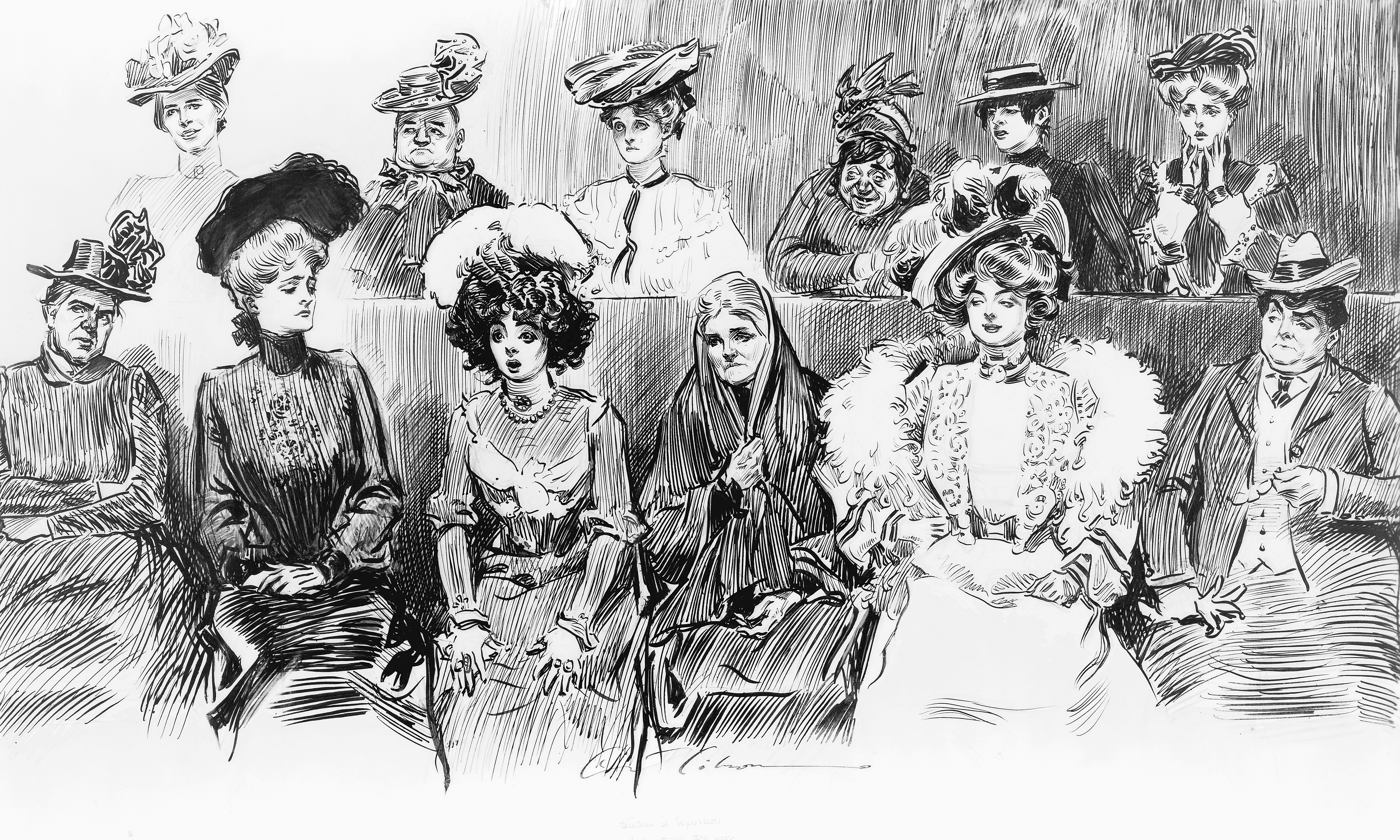
Studies in Expression: When Women Are Jurors, 1902

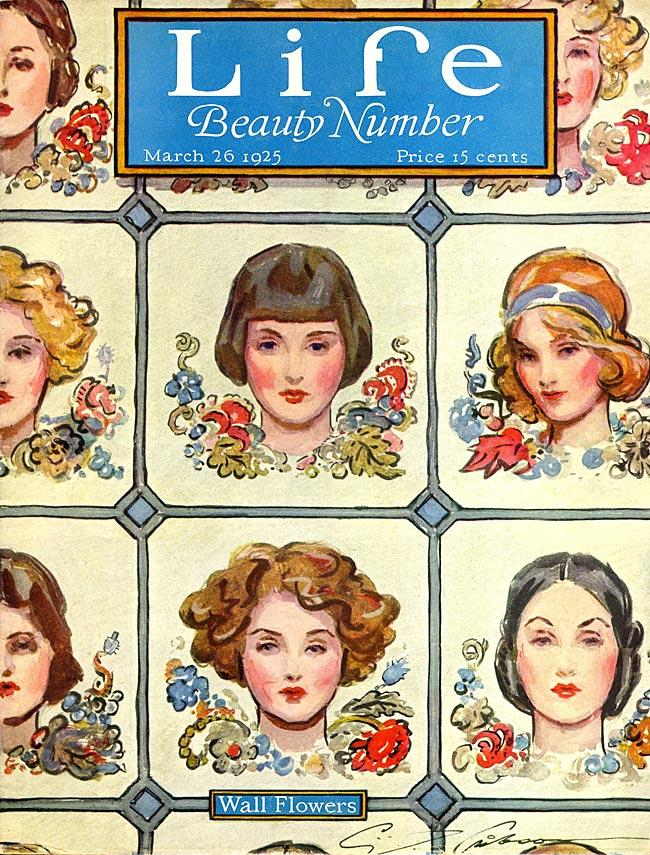
March 26, 1925 Life cover by Gibson

== See also ==
- Longfield (Charles Dana Gibson House)

== General and cited sources ==
- Bulloch, J. M. (1896). "Charles Dana Gibson". The Studio. Vol. VIII. pp. 75–81.
- Davis, Charles Belmont (January 1899). "Mr. Charles Dana Gibson and His Art". The Critic. Vol. XXXIV, no. 859. pp. 48–55.
- Fox, James (1998). The Langhorne Sisters. London: Granta Books. ISBN 978-1-862-07071-4.
- Gelman, Woody, ed. (1969). The Best of Charles Dana Gibson. New York: Bounty Books. OCLC 71597.
- Gibson, Charles Dana (1969). Edmund Vincent Gillon Jr. (ed.). The Gibson Girl and Her America: The Best Drawings of Charles Dana Gibson. New York: Dover Publications. ISBN 9780486219868. OCLC 1112853195.
- —— (1905). Sketches in Egypt. New York: Doubleday & McClure Co. OCLC 3537342.
- Marden, Orison Swett (1905). "Chapter XXXIII: Being Himself in Style and Subjects, the Secret of an Artist's Wonderful Popularity: Charles Dana Gibson, Originator of the 'Gibson Girl'". Little Visits with Great Americans. New York: The Success Company. pp. 342–352. OCLC 5292021.
