= Tom Lovell =

American illustrator and painter

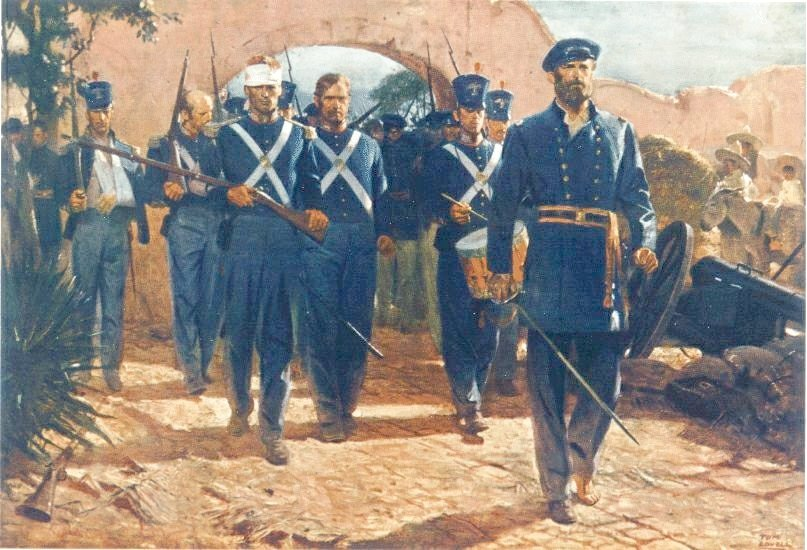
- General John A. Quitman and a Battalion of Marines Entering Mexico City, 1847, a painting by Tom Lovell
- Born: February 5, 1909; New York
- Died: June 29, 1997 (aged 88); New Mexico
- Occupation: Artist

Tom Lovell (5 February 1909 – 29 June 1997) was an American illustrator and painter. He was a creator of pulp fiction magazine covers and illustrations, and of visual art of the American West. He produced illustrations for National Geographic magazine and many others, and painted many historical Western subjects such as interactions between Indians and white settlers and traders. He was inducted into the Society of Illustrators' Hall of Fame in 1974.

== Life ==
Lovell was born in New York City on 5 February 1909 to Henry S. Lovell Jr., a telephone engineer, and Edith Scott (Russell) Lovell. He was the second of three children. He was a keen reader as a child, and although he received no early training in art, he often visited the Museum of Natural History in New York, beginning a fascination with Native American objects and weapons. In 1927, he was the valedictorian of his high school, and at graduation, he spoke on "the ill treatment of the American Indian by the U. S. Government." He attended Syracuse University from 1927 to 1931.

Lovell married Gloyd "Pink" Simmons in 1934 and moved to Norwalk, Connecticut. They had two children, David and Deborah. In 1940 Lovell and his family moved to an artists colony at Westport, Connecticut, where he became close friends with Harold von Schmidt, John Clymer, and Robert Lougheed. In 1972, he moved to Santa Fe New Mexico. In 1977, he moved to a seven-acre site in Santa Fe and built an adobe house and studio.

Turning onto the road where he lived in Santa Fe, Lovell died in a car crash on 29 June 1997, aged 88. His 48-year-old daughter Deborah was also killed in the accident, when they were hit head on at the intersection. The intersection has since been eliminated by closing off the highway.

== Education ==
Lovell enrolled at Syracuse University in 1927, graduating in 1931. His college roommate Harry Anderson, classmate Elton Fax and teacher Hibbard V.B. Kline influenced his decision to become an illustrator. In his junior year at Syracuse, Lovell sold drawings to popular "pulp" Western, gangster and detective magazines.

== Career ==
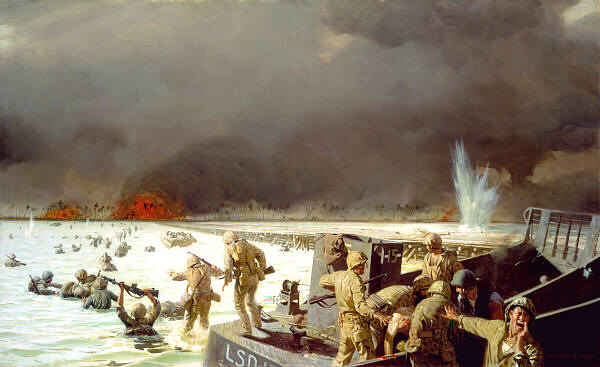
"Tarawa, South Pacific, 1943" painting by Sergeant Tom Lovell, USMC

In the early 1930s Lovell shared a studio space in New York with Harry Anderson and Al (Nick) Carter. He eventually moved to the artist colony of New Rochelle just outside New York City. New Rochelle was home to a number of other illustrators, including Norman Rockwell and Mead Schaeffer.

After 1936, Lovell progressed into providing illustrations for advertising agencies and slick magazines such as Redbook, Life, Collier's, The American, Woman's Home Companion, and Cosmopolitan. From 1940 onwards Lovell produced covers for several magazines including Ace-High Western, Clues, Complete, Detective Tales, Dime Detective, Rangeland Romances, Star Western, and Top-Notch. He also drew pen and ink interior illustrations for The Shadow, Courtroom Stories, Popular Western, Triple Western, and Clues.

Lovell served for two years in the Marine Corps Reserve during World War II. He was sent as a Staff Sergeant to Washington DC with John Clymer and Fred Lasswell to illustrate the Marine Corps magazine, Leatherneck.

On returning to Westport Lovell produced a set of historical drawings for National Geographic Magazine, including depictions of the Norman invasion of England, the career of Alexander the Great, and the conquests of the Vikings. He took great care in reproducing what he considered to be historical accuracy in the illustrations, including making models of weapons and ships, visiting historical sites and carrying out other research. He was also commissioned to create a series of paintings about Western oil exploration, as well as several paintings for the Church of Jesus Christ of Latter-day Saints.

In 1969, under commission from the Abell-Hanger Foundation, Lovell produced a series of paintings commemorating the history of the Southwest that are now on permanent display at the Permian Basin Petroleum Museum, Midland, Texas. These works, a historical series about Native Americans, represent a turning point in the subject matter of Lovell's work. From this point on he concentrated on depictions of Native American life, exploration of the West, and Western art.

In 1973, he was invited to become a charter member of the National Academy of Western Artists, and is the only artist to twice receive their Prix de West Award. In 1974, he was elected to the Society of Illustrators' Hall of Fame, and in 1975, became a member of the Cowboy Artists of America. In 1992, he received the Robert Loughweed Award from NAWA as well as their Lifetime Achievement Award. In 1994, he displayed several pieces at the National Academy of Western Artists Show in Oklahoma City.

The Tom Lovell Collection of personal letters, photographs and scrapbooks containing tear sheets of his completed paintings is currently held at the Norman Rockwell Museum Archives' Reference Center Collection. In 2006, the NRM put several of Lovell's paintings on display as part of the exhibition "National Geographic: The Art of Exploration".

== Methods ==
Lovell said: "I consider myself a storyteller with a brush. I try to place myself back in imagined situations that would make interesting and appealing pictures. I am intent on producing paintings that relate to the human experience."

On illustrating for pulp magazines in the 1930s and 1940s: "Painting for the pulps was great training. You learned to tell a story in close compass. You couldn’t spread out over two pages, and you couldn't take three months to research it. You had to get the job out in ten days. This took discipline."

On historical research methods: "When you're painting history, it always comes down to fundamentals. Reading is a help. But writers don’t need the depth of information that a painter does. With a few well chosen words, a writer can set the scene, whereas an artist must know the costumes, the weapons, what the interiors looked like, the horse tack – all the thousand things to make it come alive. I wasn't there when Alexander marched across India. But I was able to do a painting of what Alexander did by working like hell at it."

== Bibliography ==
Notes
