= Al Parker (artist) =

American artist and illustrator

Al Parker in 1952

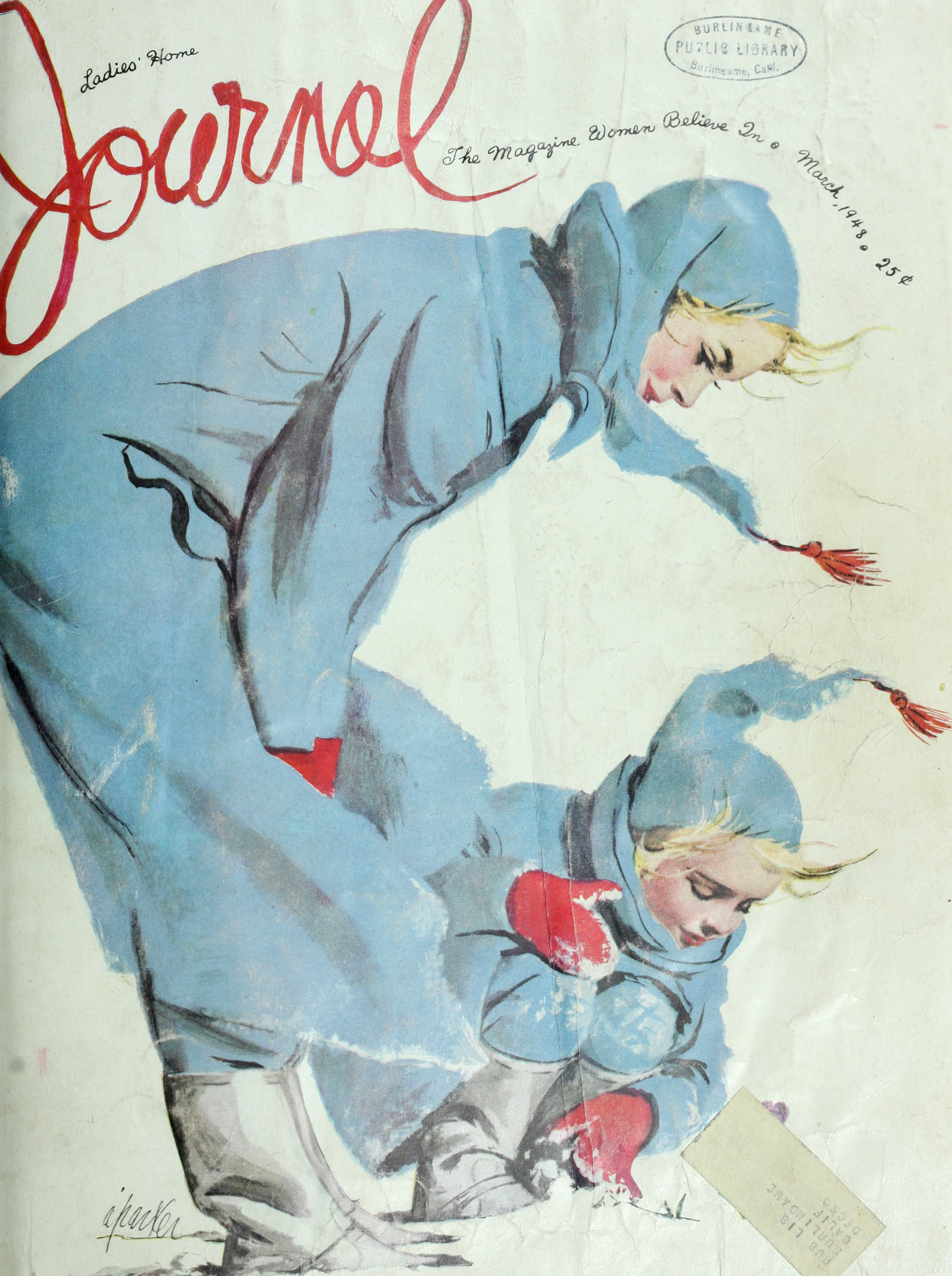
Ladies' Home Journal, March 1948. Cover by Al Parker

Al Parker (1906–1985) was an American artist and illustrator.

Parker's display of talent as a teenager led his grandfather, a Mississippi River Pilot, to pay for Al's first year in Washington University's School of Fine Arts in St. Louis, Missouri in 1922. He also played saxophone in a jazz band on a river boat to earn money for tuition. He participated in many combination jam-sessions-and-sketching-trips to service hospitals during World War II. He married a fellow student, Evelyn, and later joined with several former classmates to open an advertising agency in St. Louis. The business did not do well during the Great Depression, and Parker moved to New York City in 1935.

Parker got a break when a cover illustration he did for House Beautiful won a national competition. He soon was producing illustrations for Chatelaine, Collier's, Ladies' Home Journal and Woman's Home Companion. Starting in 1938, he produced a total of 50 covers over a 13-year period for the Ladies' Home Journal. He also sold illustrations to Cosmopolitan, Good Housekeeping, McCall's, The Saturday Evening Post, Sports Illustrated, Town and Country and Vogue.

Parker later became part of the art colony in suburban New Rochelle, New York, which was well known for its unprecedented number of prominent American illustrators (more than fifty percent of the illustrations in the country's leading publications were done by artists from New Rochelle).

Parker is credited with creating a new school of illustration and was much imitated. In an effort to distinguish himself from his imitators, he worked in a variety of styles, themes and media. Examples range from children's crayons to acrylics. In cooperation with the magazine's art director, he secretly provided every illustration in an issue of Cosmopolitan, using different pseudonyms, styles and mediums for each story.

Over the years, he won more than twenty-five gold medals and awards of excellence in Art Directors Club and Society of Illustrators' shows. He was also a past president of the Westport Artists.

Parker was one of the founding faculty members for the Famous Artists School. He was elected to the Society of Illustrators' Hall of Fame in 1965. A stamp commemorating his art was issued by the United States Postal Service on February 1, 2001 as part of the American Illustrators Issue series.

Parker moved to Carmel, California by 1961, and with the demise of many of the magazines, his output of illustrations was curtailed. He continued to do occasional assignments for publications such as Sports Illustrated and Boys' Life. One such commission was an outstanding series of paintings of the Grand Prix auto race of Europe for Sports Illustrated.

His son, Kit Parker, founded the film company, Kit Parker Films.
