= Mead Schaeffer =

American illustrator (1898-1980)

- Born: July 15, 1898; Freedom Plains, New York
- Died: November 6, 1980 (aged 82); New York, New York
- Education: Pratt Institute
- Occupations: Illustrator and painter

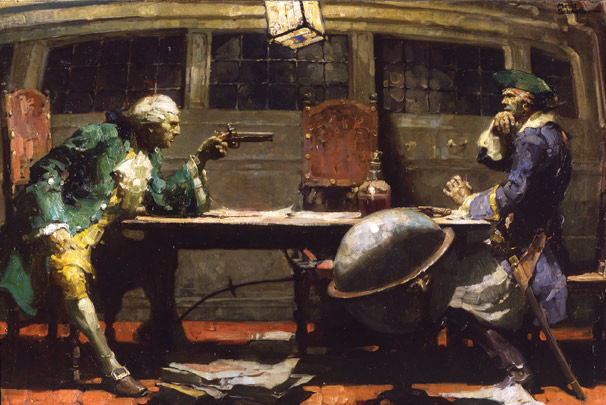
Mead Schaeffer illustration for The Black Buccaneer by Stephen Meader, published in 1920

Mead Schaeffer (July 15, 1898 – November 6, 1980) was an American illustrator active from the early to middle twentieth century.

== Biography ==
Schaeffer was born in Freedom Plains, New York, in 1898, the son of Presbyterian preacher Charles Schaeffer and his wife Minnie. He grew up in Springfield, Massachusetts. After completing high school, he enrolled in the Pratt Institute in 1916. At Pratt his teachers included Harvey Dunn and Charles Chapman. Dunn critiqued many of Schaeffer's early projects. While a student at Pratt, Schaeffer illustrated the first of seven 'Golden Boy' books written by L. P. Wyman. Mead was married in 1921. He and his wife, Elizabeth, were to be the parents of two daughters.

In 1922, at age 24, he was hired to illustrate a series of classic novels for publisher Dodd Mead. His work for Dodd Mead continued until 1930. The books that he illustrated during this period included Moby-Dick, Typee, and Omoo by Herman Melville; The Count of Monte Cristo; and Les Misérables by Victor Hugo.

In 1930, Schaeffer turned his attention from fictional characters to real people depicted in real settings. During the 1930s and 1940s he received commissions from magazines including Good Housekeeping, McCall's, the Saturday Evening Post, The Ladies Home Journal, Country Gentleman, and Cosmopolitan. He produced 46 covers for the weekly Saturday Evening Post. His work as a war correspondent for the Post during World War II resulted in a well-known series of covers illustrating American military personnel.

He lived for a time in New Rochelle, New York, but for most of his career lived in Arlington, Vermont, where his studio was in a barn. Norman Rockwell was a good friend, and Schaeffer and his family often posed as models for Rockwell's Saturday Evening Post illustrations and paintings.

In retirement, Schaeffer lived in Vermont, where Rockwell was a neighbor. Schaeffer died in New York City from a heart attack on November 6, 1980.
