= Erwin S. Barrie =

American businessman

- Born: 1886; Canton, Ohio
- Died: 1983 (aged 96–97); Delray Beach, Florida
- Occupations: Artist, businessman

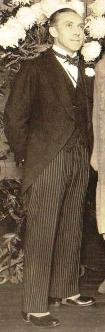
Photograph of Erwin S. Barrie at Leopold Seyffert's wedding

Erwin Seaver Barrie (1886–1983) was an American businessman in the arts. He was most closely associated with New York City's Grand Central Art Galleries, which he managed from its founding in 1922 until he retired in 1975.

== Early life ==
Barrie was born in Canton, Ohio. He attended Cornell University and then studied landscape painting at the Art Institute of Chicago. After his studies he became manager of the art collection at Carson Pirie Scott; it was at this time that he befriended Hovsep Pushman and other artists.

== Career ==
In 1922 Barrie was hired by businessman and art patron Walter Leighton Clark to manage the Grand Central Art Galleries, which he was in the process of establishing. Clark had secured space in Grand Central Terminal, and his goal was to create "the largest sales gallery of art in the world." The galleries extended over most of the terminal's sixth floor, 15,000 square feet (1,400 m^{2}), and offered eight main exhibition rooms, a foyer gallery, and a reception area. The architect was William Adams Delano, best known for designing Yale Divinity School's Sterling Quadrangle.

The Grand Central Art Galleries were managed by Barrie for more than 50 years; he guided them through the Depression and World War II as well as enabling many of their triumphs. In the 1940s Barrie helped establish the Galleries' "Grand Central Moderns" division, and managed it until Colette Roberts took over the reins in 1951. After the gallery "wandered about for several years" it settled at 130 East 56th Street in 1950. Artists represented by Grand Central Moderns included Byron Browne, Lamar Dodd, Jennett Lam, and Louise Nevelson.

Barrie's treatment of artists was particularly respectful. For Pushman he "maintained a separate velvet-walled salon.... The only illumination allowed on his paintings were specially designed reflector lights attached to the rear of his carefully selected antique frames." When Henry Tanner was unable to provide a canvas for the Galleries' 1930 members' show, Barrie chose one of the artist's paintings from the stockroom and entered it in his name. The work, Etaples Fisher Folk, won Tanner the Walter L. Clark prize, worth $500.

In November 1950 Barrie had a show of his own paintings at the Galleries. The exhibition, titled "Famous Golf Holes I Have Played," was attended by former amateur golf champion Willie Turnesa among others. Speaking of his paintings, Barrie said:

The little 11th hole at [Tarrytown, N.Y.'s] Sleepy Hollow, a one-shotter of 142 yds., is, on the other hand, attractive and gay. It is comparatively easy. The trees are soft and inviting, the reflections in the water are lyric and I have tried to give just that impression in my colorful and atmospheric interpretation of it.

In 1958 the Grand Central Art Galleries were forced out of the Grand Central Terminal, which had been their home since 1922, by the construction of the Pan Am Building. Barrie supervised the Galleries' relocation to the second floor of the Biltmore Hotel, where they had six exhibition rooms and an office. Barrie directed the Galleries at that location until 1975, when he retired.

== Death ==
Barrie died in Delray Beach, Florida, in 1983 after a brief illness. He also had a home in Greenwich, Connecticut. He was survived by his second wife, Rose Marie, whom he married in 1974 after the death of his first wife, Grace.
