= Roselle Osk =

American printmaker (1884–1954)

- Born: Roselle Hellenberg; February 27, 1884; New York City, US
- Died: May 4, 1954 (aged 70); New York City, US
- Resting place: Riverside Cemetery (Saddle Brook, New Jersey)
- Education: Art Students League of New York, National Academy of Design
- Known for: drypoint, Etching
- Notable work: "Hands," series of etchings
- Style: Realism
- Spouse: Marcus L. Osk

Roselle Osk (1884–1954) was an American printmaker known for her drypoints and etchings. Her style was realist and her subjects were figure studies, landscapes, and seascapes. She exhibited frequently during the 1930s and 1940s and was awarded prizes by the Society of American Etchers, Philadelphia Print Club, and National Association of Women Artists. Her work was often selected for "Best Prints of the Year" shows held by the etchers group.

== Early life and education ==
Osk was born and raised in Manhattan. After graduating from Hunter College in 1903 she studied at the Art Students League until 1906 and at the National Academy of Design from 1912 to 1915. At the Art Students League her teachers were Frank DuMond Henry Reuterdahl Bryson Burroughs and Kenyon Cox. Some years later she also studied at the Grand Central School of Art.

== Artistic career ==
Roselle Osk, Number Four in the Series of Hands: The Sailor, about 1935, drypoint, 8 x 10 inches

Roselle Osk, Little Old Lady, 1937, etching, 10 x 7 1/2 inches

Roselle Osk, The Sisters, about 1937, drypoint, 10 x 8 inches

Roselle Osk, Six O'Clock, drypoint, 10 x 8 inches

Osk began her career in 1920 as a painter. In 1917 she had begun spending the summer months in Bayport, New York on the south shore of Long Island, and in 1927 she showed paintings for the first of many occasions in a group show held by the Associated Artists of Long Island in Patchogue. (Note: Associated Artists of Long Island was a membership organization composed of artists and laymen, most of them from Suffolk County, New York. It was formed in 1924 with the goal of holding group exhibitions of members' work. The show held in 1927 in which Osk's work appeared was the fourth annual one held by the group.) In this and other exhibitions of the late 1920s and early 1930s Osk showed portraits in oil, pastel, and crayon, as well as landscapes and a still life in oil. She began her career as a printmaker in 1932 and, while she continued to show oils from time to time, from the middle 1930s onward she mainly showed drypoints and etchings. (Note: Beginning in 1935 exhibition reviews and display ads mention Osk's prints far more often than her paintings.)

Osk's work often appeared in exhibitions of organizations of which she was a member. In addition to the Associated Artists of Long Island, these included the Associated American Artists, Art Students League, National Association of Women Artists, Grand Central Art Galleries, and Artists Equity. (Note: The Artists Equity Association was formed in New York in 1947 to protect the interests of professional artists, provide resources to help them succeed in their work, and promote opportunities for its members. Founders included Will Barnet, Thomas Hart Benton, Stuart Davis, Edward Hopper, and Louise Nevelson. Its first president was Yasuo Kuniyoshi.) She also showed with self-organized groups, most prominently ones associated with New York's Municipal Art Committee. In 1936 Osk joined with Will Barnet, Kathrin Cawein, and Betty Waldo Parish to show prints in one such exhibition. In 1939 she joined with six artists to show paintings in another of them. (Note: The Municipal Art Committee was a non-profit group set up by the city government in 1935 to promote art, dance, and music and to support their creators. In 1936 it began holding art exhibitions. Self-organized groups of between 10 and 15 could arrange to show their work over two-week periods. The committee took no fees or commissions on any sales that these shows produced.)

Throughout her career she made portraits, landscapes and seascapes, figure studies, genre paintings, and still lifes. In 1941 a critic said it was the portraits that had made her famous. In 1938 the New York Times critic, Howard Devree, said that Osk's prints were outstanding. A series of four etchings called, "Hands," was widely admired. When shown in 1937 Devree called them "arresting." When shown again in 1941, the Times critic, Ada Rainy, said they were effective in their characterization, and one of them ("The Sailor," shown at left) was included in the book, American Prize Prints of the Twentieth Century. (Note: The set of prints included "The Lumberman," "The Baby," and "The Seamstress" as well as "The Sailor." It was cited again in her New York Times obituary and in a retrospective exhibition in 1963.) In her 1941 article on Osk's etchings, Ada Rainey, called "Little Old Lady" (shown at right) "a fine characterization." In 1942 Rainey described a drypoint, "The Sisters" (shown at left), as "done with understanding of the value of strength of line and the structure of the figures." In 1953 the Times critic, Leslie Judd Portner, wrote that Osk's drypoint, "Six O'Clock" (shown at right) was "completely realistic." As well as paintings, etchings, and drypoints, Osk made aquatints and etched relief prints in the late 1940s.

During the 1940s and 1950s Osk held frequent solo exhibitions in Sayville, Long Island and on three occasions held them in Manhattan (1931, 1938, and 1941). During the late 1930s and early 1940s juries often selected her prints for inclusion in "best prints" exhibitions held by the Society of American Etchers. She was awarded prizes in 1938, 1940, 1941, 1945, and 1946.

== Artistic practice ==
Osk usually produced her drypoints and etchings on presses she kept in New York and at a summer home on Long Island. She usually used a cream-colored Japanese paper and made no more than one hundred of each.

== Personal life ==
Osk was the daughter of Herman and Cornelia Thalmessinger Hellenberg. Cornelia Hellenberg, who died in 1915, was a director of the Temple Shaaray Tefila in Manhattan. Herman Hellenberg was a partner in Hellenberg & Lowenstein, manufacturers of men's neck wear. The couple had a second child, a son named Lawrence. In 1906 Osk married Marcus L. Osk, owner of a prosperous Manhattan real estate business named Merit Realty Corp. They had two sons, Richard and George, and a daughter, Virginia (Mrs. Kenneth Poli). Osk died on May 6, 1954, in her home on West 87th Street in Manhattan.
