= Walter Sherman Gifford =

American businessman (1885–1966)

His Excellency Walter Sherman Gifford
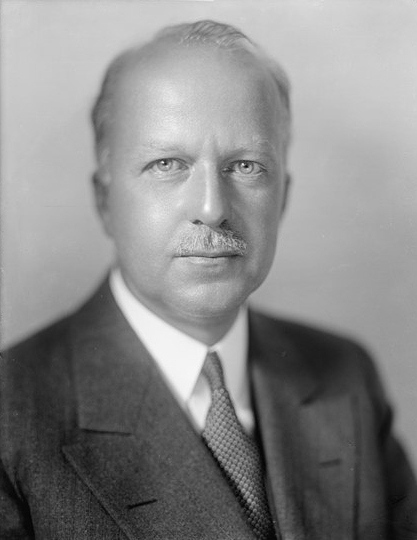
- Gifford, 1905–1945

48th United States Ambassador to the United Kingdom
- In office December 12, 1950 – January 23, 1953
- President: Harry S. Truman
- Preceded by: Lewis Williams Douglas
- Succeeded by: Winthrop W. Aldrich

6th President of American Telephone & Telegraph
- In office 1925–1948
- Preceded by: Harry Bates Thayer
- Succeeded by: Leroy A. Wilson

Personal details
- Born: Walter Sherman Gifford; January 10, 1885 Salem, Massachusetts, U.S.
- Died: May 7, 1966 (aged 81) New York, New York, U.S.
- Education: Harvard University
- Occupation: Businessman

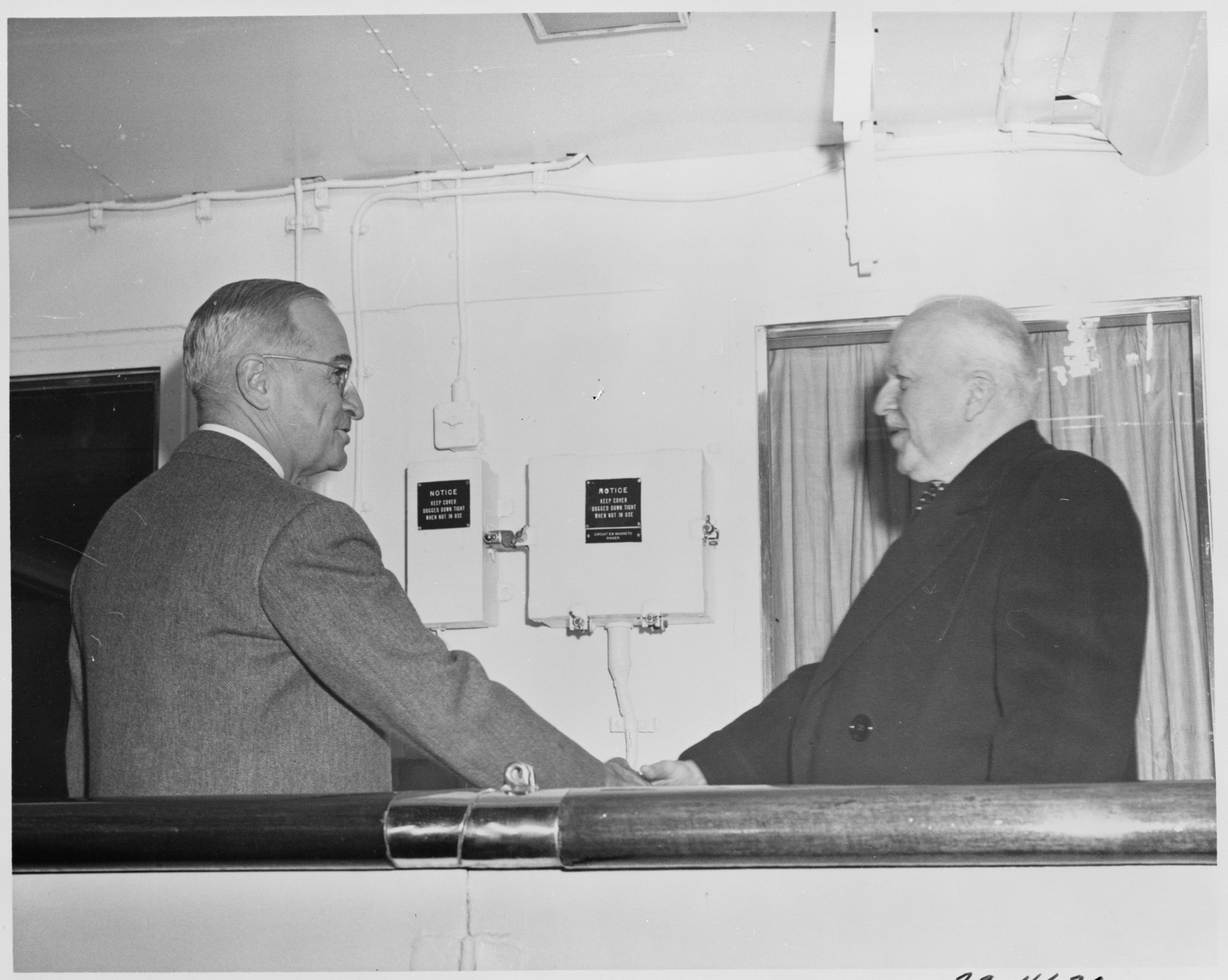
Gifford (right) welcomed by President Truman in 1952

Walter Sherman Gifford (January 10, 1885 – May 7, 1966) was an American businessman best known as the president of the AT&T Corporation from 1925 to 1948. He later served as United States Ambassador to the United Kingdom from 1950 to 1953.

== Biography ==
Walter Sherman Gifford was born in Salem, Massachusetts, on January 10, 1885. He graduated from Harvard University in 1905. In July 1906 he joined the Western Electric Company in Chicago as Assistant Secretary and Treasurer. In 1911 Gifford left Western Electric, went to Arizona in a copper mining venture that he tired of after six months. However, Theodore N. Vail hired him as Chief statistician for American Telephone & Telegraph in New York. In 1916 he was called to national service during World War I.

During the war he became Supervising Director of the Committee on Industrial Preparedness of the National Consulting Board, Director of the Council of National Defense and Advisory Commission, and Secretary of the U. S. Representation on the Inter-Allied Munitions Council. After the war he returned to AT&T and soon became a vice president. In 1925, at age 40, he became the president of the AT&T Corporation when the existing president Harry Bates Thayer was made chairman of the board of directors. That same year he established the Bell Telephone Laboratories as a separate entity which would take over the work being conducted by Western Electric's engineering department's research division. According to one historian,

One of Gifford’s most brilliant early staff appointments was that of Arthur W. Page to the job of vice-president for public relations. ... Gifford persuaded him to join AT&T early in 1927.

Gifford had a video telephone conversation in 1927 with Herbert Hoover, then Secretary of Commerce, through AT&T's pioneering technology in television transmission over wire. He was elected to the American Philosophical Society in 1931 and was awarded the Vermilye Medal in 1943.

During Gifford's presidency lasting 23 years, AT&T experienced tremendous growth. Gifford increased operating revenue from $657 million to $2.25 billion. In 1927, Gifford relaunched his firm's overseas operations and by 1948, 72 foreign countries were linked by wire and radio with AT&T lines. In 1950, he retired from the post of chairman of AT&T which he occupied from 1948 to 1950. By then he had served AT&T for 45 years.

== Other information ==
Kenneth Bilby (1986) tells of Gifford's courage in business:

..despite his conservative orthodoxy, there were elements of daring in Gifford's character, and he was innovative in corporate finance. In 1919, when utility bond issues were not in great favor in Wall Street, he persuaded his management to go directly to market with a $90-million offering of its own securities. It was a gargantuan sum at the time, larger than any ever raised without the underwriting support of investment bankers. But the over-the-counter offer was quickly subscribed, and AT&T received the full amount without payment of large brokerage commissions.

In 1916 Gifford was named a Fellow of the American Statistical Association.

In 1922 Gifford became one of the founding trustees of the Grand Central Art Galleries, an artists' cooperative established that year by John Singer Sargent, Edmund Greacen, Walter Leighton Clark, and others. Also on the board were the Galleries' architect, William Adams Delano; Robert W. DeForest, president of the Metropolitan Museum of Art; Frank Logan, vice-president of the Art Institute of Chicago; Irving T. Bush, president of the Bush Terminal Company; and Clark. Gifford served as secretary and treasurer for the organization.

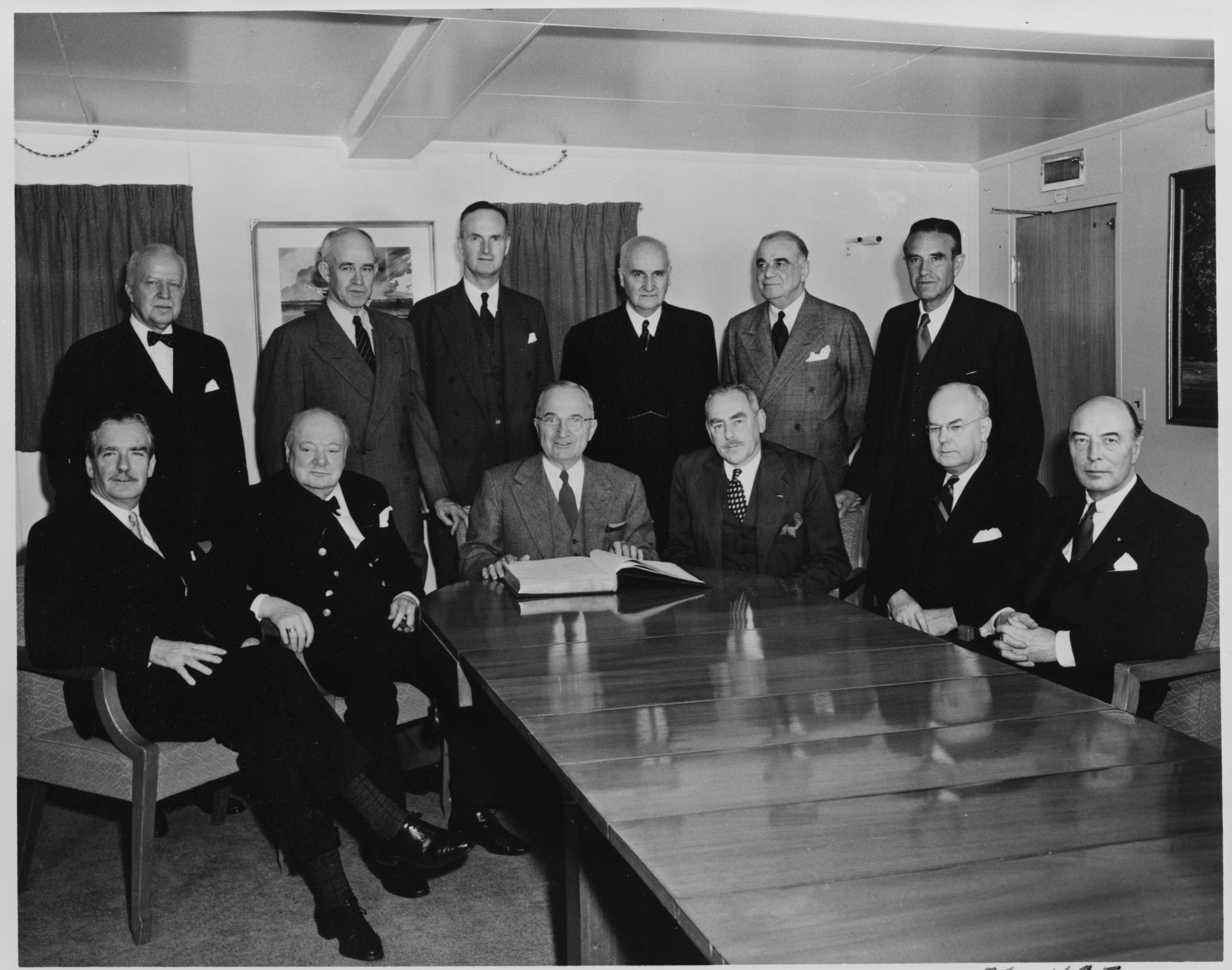
Gifford (standing, 1st left) at the meeting of Truman and Churchill aboard USS Williamsburg (1952)

After his retirement from AT&T, Gifford served as the U.S. Ambassador to Great Britain from 1950 to 1953. His son Richard P. Gifford succeeded him as an international businessman.

== See also ==
- Telephone in United States history
