= Leopold Seyffert =

American painter (1887–1956)

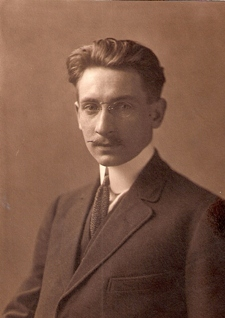
Leopold Seyffert ca. 1910

Leopold Gould Seyffert (January 6, 1887 – June 13, 1956) was an American painter. Born in California, Missouri, and raised in Colorado and then Pittsburgh, his career brought him eventually to New York City, via Philadelphia and Chicago. In New York City, the dealer Macbeth established him as one of the leading portraitists of the 20th century and his over 500 portraits continue to decorate the galleries, rooms and halls of many of America's museums and institutions.

== Overview ==
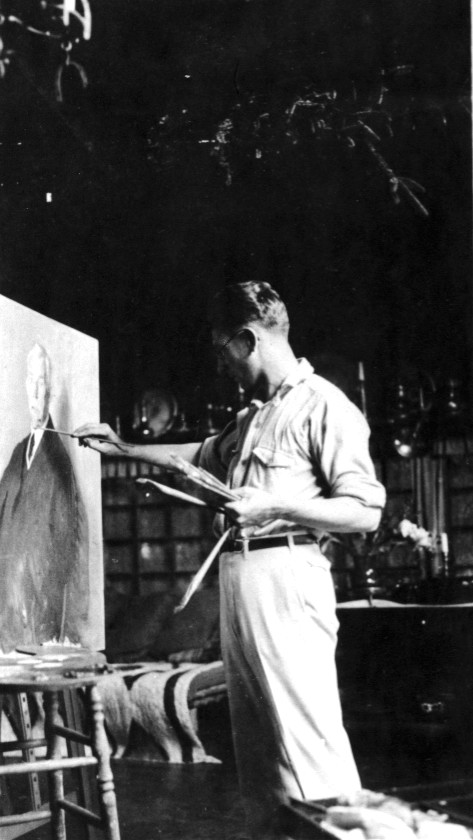
Seyffert painting William Burnham on Suttons Island, Maine 1916

Among the many people that Seyffert painted were figures of America's cultural, business and political elite. His subjects included Henry Clay Frick (Heinz History Center, Pittsburgh), Fritz Kreisler (National Portrait Gallery), Andrew Mellon (Choate School and BNY Mellon Collection), John Wanamaker (US Postal Museum), Edward T. Stotesbury (Stotesbury Collection), Elizabeth Arden, Samuel Gompers (New York Historical Society), John Graver Johnson (Corcoran Art Gallery), railroad financier Edward Brinton Smith (Private Collection), Charles Lindbergh and David Sarnoff.

Seyffert was recipient of a long string of prizes and honors given by the major American art organizations and museums, often for his non-commissioned work. In these paintings he painted with a vigorous brushwork and palette (as his older contemporaries, Robert Henri and George Bellows, sometimes did in their paintings of children).

As a young artist, Seyffert traveled three times to Europe in 1910, 1912, and 1914. Like many young artists he painted from Velasquez in the Prado and was influenced by Hals, Van Gogh and Goya. During these trips he used ordinary people as subjects. Their unique faces and colorful costumes inspired some of his earliest works. Later his portraits, nudes and flower still lifes kept the lessons learned from these years while adding a more refined and simpler style. Seyffert's life and career spanned the first half of the 20th century. He lived, taught and painted in several historic cities and many of his sitters played a significant role in American history, particularly during the roaring 20s.

== Childhood and studies ==
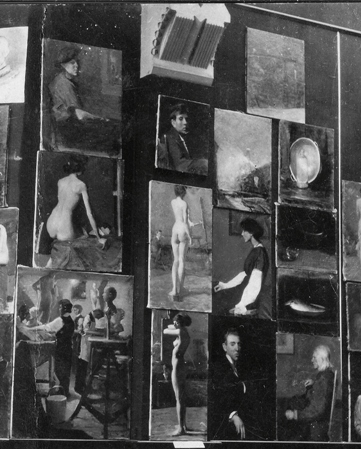
Seyffert works during William Merritt Chase's class show at the Pennsylvania Academy

Seyffert's ancestors' origins were in the Saxony region of Germany, with his grandparents hailing from Zwikau, a village near Leipzig. His grandfather and father, Hermann (at age 4) arrived in New York in 1854. The family traveled to St. Louis and then went west settling with other German immigrants in Missouri.

Seyffert was born in the town of California, Moniteau County, Missouri in 1887, the second youngest of seven, to Hermann and Emma Tweihaus Seyffert. The following year his family moved to Colorado Springs, Colorado, where they built a cabin in the foothills of the Cheyenne Mountains on the Cheyenne Creek, near what is today The Broadmoor resort. In 1890 his father died after falling off a roof, leaving all the family having to work or marry early. Leopold's earliest art exposure came from his briefly studying with an artist named La Salle but he also painted cakes in the local bakery and glass eyes for a taxidermist. His older brother Lou moved to Pittsburgh and after getting a job in the office of Standard Oil geologist John Worthington, he sent for "Lee" and their mother to move east. In 1904, en route they visited the St. Louis World's Fair where he saw his first painting exhibition. Once in Pittsburgh Leopold began working as an office boy for Worthington and his artistic talent came to the attention of his boss. For two years he studied at the Stevenson Art School with Horatio Stevenson while living with the Worthington family and later Worthington loaned him the money to attend the Pennsylvania Academy of the Fine Arts, a debt he paid off with many portraits of their family.

Starting in 1906 until 1913 he studied at the academy with Thomas Pollock Anschutz, William Merritt Chase, Cecilia Beaux and Hugh H. Breckenridge. During these lean years he worked at the local boys club and as a semi-professional baseball player, while his commissions began. Thanks to the recommendations of William Merritt Chase he painted Chase's lawyer's daughter, Libby Deyoung, who later married Sylvan Levin. Chase also bought a portrait he did of his wife Helen Fleck. He did many copies of works in the Federal Courthouse in Philadelphia and these paintings, from 1905 to 1915 are little known and still hang in many spots in and around Philadelphia.

== Teaching and career ==
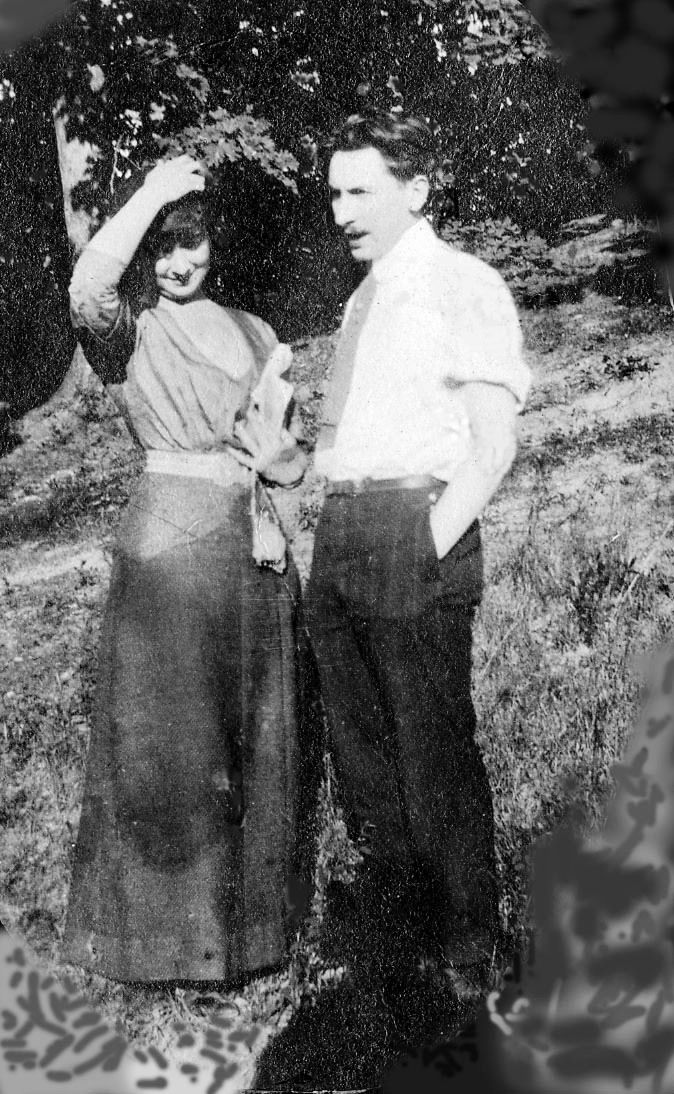
Helen (Fleck) and Leopold Seyffert, Seal Harbor, ME, 1916

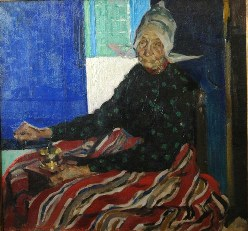
Tired Out painted in Volendam, Holland Collection: Woodmere Art Museum

From 1909 to 1913, he taught at Graphic Sketch Club, Philadelphia, which now is the Samuel S. Fleisher Memorial. In 1910, he won the Cresson Traveling Scholarship, and went to Europe with his fiancée, the painter Helen Fleck, and her mother. In 1911 they married and in 1912, he again won the Cresson Scholarship, allowing them to travel and work in Volendam, Holland. During these years, he met Leopold Stokowski, who became a close friend, and the resulting portrait (below) won the 1913 Fellowship Prize and the Popular Prize at the Pennsylvania Academy annual. Also that year, he won honorable mention at the Carnegie International Exhibition for a Volendam painting, Tired Out, and he was honored with a special section at Fourth Annual Exhibition of the Associated Artists of Pittsburgh. During the summer, he painted Robert Walton Goelet’s wife, Elsie Whelen Goelet at Ochre Court in Newport, Rhode Island.

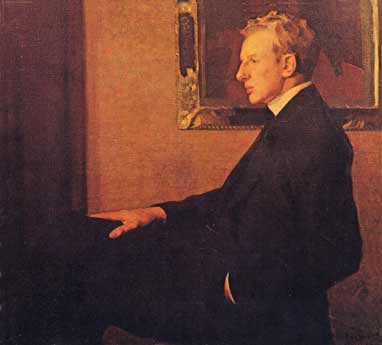
Leopold Stokowski by Leopold Seyffert, 1912

In 1914, he and Helen and their first child, Mary Louise, summered in Spain where he and friend Waldo Pierce visited Ignacio Zuloaga, and painted colorful people in Segovia, including Daniel Zuloaga. The same year, he was one of three artists in group exhibition at the Memorial Art Gallery, Rochester, where he exhibited some of his early masterworks, most of which are in museums today.

He continued his teaching during 1914–1921 at another school, the Philadelphia School of Design for Women (now Moore College of Art) in Philadelphia, a school that at the time was managed largely by the Sartain family. In 1915 their second child, Richard (Leopold, Jr.), was born. That year he won the gold medal at the Philadelphia Art Club, and silver medal, Panama Pacific Exposition, San Francisco. In 1916 he was elected an Associate of the National Academy of Design, also winning the Beck Gold Medal at the Pennsylvania Academy, for a portrait of the violinist Fritz Kreisler, now in the National Portrait Gallery. The same year he had solo exhibitions in Boston at St. Botolph Club and Copley Gallery. He summered in Seal Harbor, Maine, (photographed left) with group of Philadelphia artists and musicians where he began series of charcoal portraits of these personalities. He returned to Seal Harbor the following summer where his second son, Peter, was born. In the fall he moved to Chicago and began teaching at the School of the Art Institute of Chicago (a post he continued to hold until 1927). In December he was in a group exhibit at the Detroit Museum of Art with Karl Anderson, Hayley Lever and Ernest Lawson.

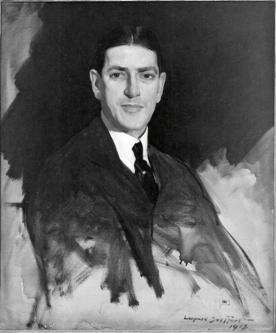
Samuel S. Fleisher painted by Seyffert (1918) in one sitting for a $10,000 war bond

In 1918 he won the Temple Gold Medal at the Pennsylvania Academy of the Fine Arts, for Lacquer Screen, now in their collection, and also both the Altman and First Hallgarten Prizes at the National Academy of Design. Lacquer Screen is one of many nudes painted of his model and likely mistress at that time, Bobbi, and paintings of her are now in major museum collections, such as the Los Angeles County Museum, Illinois State Museum, High Museum of Art and the New Orleans Museum of Art. That year he had his second group exhibition at the Memorial Art Gallery in Rochester. In 1921 he won the Thomas R. Proctor Prize for portraiture, from the National Academy of Design. Also, his association with the Art Institute of Chicago expanded with his portraits of notable citizens of Chicago included in a circuit show which they organized and sent traveling. It included financiers, artists, musicians and writers living in Chicago at that time, such as Potter Palmer Jr., Frederick Stock, Albin Polasek, and Marshall Field, Jr. In 1922 he had a solo exhibition at the Detroit Institute of Arts. In 1923 he was a founding artist member of the Grand Central Art Galleries in New York and he was chosen in its initial lottery offering with such artists as John Singer Sargent. Soon after he began to maintain a studio in New York and in 1925 Grand Central began representing him in his portrait art.

Seyffert's sense of humor and congenial manner came from his roots as an immigrant child. He was determined and thoroughly enjoyed the company of his sitters. Even if they were very rich, he was never intimidated. In 1923 he won the Palmer Gold Medal, Art Institute of Chicago and later that year summered in Switzerland where his boys were attending boarding school. In 1924 he won the Logan Gold Medal and Hearst Prize, both at the Art Institute of Chicago and he had a solo exhibition at the Carnegie Institute, Pittsburgh. That summer he visited with his family the home of Hans & Alice Kindler in Senlis, France, where they were all photographed by Man Ray.

He won the Logan Prize at the Art Institute of Chicago in 1925 and that same year had solo exhibitions at Columbus Gallery of Fine Arts, Ohio and the Grand Central Art Galleries, New York. He was elected to full membership to the National Academy of Design and he visited his family in Paris, where he painted My Family, Brooklyn Museum. He served on the annual art jury at the National Academy for the following ten years.

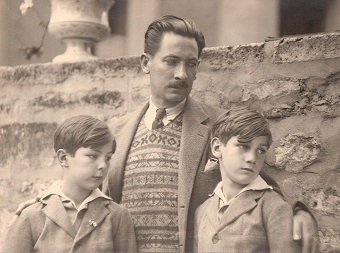
family photo by Man Ray 1924

By this point in his career he had averaged 25 paintings a year and many of his works were of those who had significant roles in American history. He was not a society portraitist though some of those who valued themselves were painted by him. More often however it was a group or company that commissioned a portrait for posterity and he painted some household names today like Heinz, Kraft, Taft, and Mellon. In 1926 he won the Stotesbury Gold Medal, Pennsylvania Academy, and gold medal, Philadelphia Sesquicentennial Exposition. He had a solo exhibition at Carson Pirie Scott in Chicago previously managed by Erwin S. Barrie and an article by Frederick Lowes appeared in All-Arts Magazine. In 1928 he moved to New York, where he acquired a studio at the Des Artistes, 1 W. 67th Street and during this period he developed a long time professional relationship with the American illustrators of the time, James Montgomery Flagg and Howard Chandler Christy. His 1929 exhibitions at the Detroit Institute of the Arts and the Hackett Galleries, New York, brought him further commissions and he won the Lippincott Prize at the Pennsylvania Academy with an article by George W. Eggers in American Magazine of Art appearing the same year. In 1930 he and his wife Helen Fleck divorced and he married Grace J. Vernon ("Bobbi") who had been his model for over 15 years. Her maiden name was actually Grace Heinzerling – a name she changed to one that sounds more Anglo. That year he won the Popular Prize, Carnegie International Exhibition and had a solo exhibition of charcoal portraits at the Corcoran Gallery of Art, Washington, D.C.

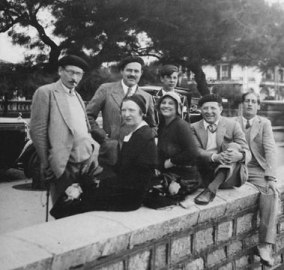
Seyffert, Hemingway, and Speiser in Hendaye, France 1931 courtesy The Speiser & Easterling-Hallman Collection of Ernest Hemingway, University of South Carolina Libraries

In 1931 he won the Isidor Medal at National Academy of Design and that summer he travelled to Hendaye, France, spending time with his family, Maurice Speiser (a longtime friend from Philadelphia) and Ernest Hemingway (right). In 1932 he had a solo exhibition at J.J. Gillespie & Company, Pittsburgh, and Robert C. Vose Galleries, Boston. His show in Boston led to him painting several Governors of Massachusetts and the biggest benefactor of the Boston Public Library, Mr. Deferrari. At the library's entrance an entire room is devoted to this painting. Continuing his interest in painting unique and different people, in 1934 he traveled to Guatemala on a commission from the Grace Lines to paint the people of Antigua and Chichicastenango. Also that year he was chosen by Holger Cahill to paint a New York City police officer, Bernard Jeppson, with the painting to be unveiled at Rockefeller Center in the city's first Municipal Art Show. The following year he had a solo exhibition at Vose Galleries, Boston. He bought a weekend house near Westport, Connecticut, in 1936 and renovated the barn into a studio.

== Last years ==
He became an avid gardener and began painting flower still lifes. For the following 10 years he spent time between his country home in Easton, Connecticut and New York. In 1946 he was honored with the Gold Medal of Honor at the Allied Artists Exhibition, New York. At this point in his life his health began to deteriorate from his smoking and drinking, though his commissions continued. In 1953 while he was painting two of the National Gallery's (Washington, DC) founders, Rush and Samuel Kress, his wife Bobbi died. Both his boys, Peter and Richard (formerly Leopold, Jr.), were living in Peru. He painted his last portrait of Frank Porter Graham and also during his last years a new model and companion, Ramona, lived with and cared for him until his death from esophageal cancer in Bound Brook, New Jersey, in 1956.
