= Grand Central School of Art =

Art school in New York City (1922–1944)

- Grand Central Terminal (east wing), New York City, New York, U.S.

Information
- Established: 1922
- Founders: Edmund Greacen, Walter Leighton Clark, John Singer Sargent
- Closed: 1944
- Affiliation: Grand Central Art Galleries

The Grand Central School of Art was an American art school in New York City, founded in 1922 by the painters Edmund Greacen, Walter Leighton Clark and John Singer Sargent. It closed in 1944.

== History ==
The school was established and run by the Grand Central Art Galleries, an artists' cooperative founded by Sargent, Greacen, Clark, and others in 1922. The school was directed by Greacen, Sargent and Daniel Chester French and occupied 7,000 square feet (650 m^{2}) on the seventh floor of the east wing of the Grand Central Terminal in New York City. Press accounts of the school's opening reception mentioned the instructors: Greacen, George Pearse Ennis, sculptor Chester Beach, muralists Ezra Winter and Dean Cornwell, the illustrator and costume designer Helen Dryden, Nicolai Fechin, Julian Bowes and George Elmer Browne.

The school had more than 400 students its first year and soon grew to 900, making it one of the largest art schools in the city. Greacen engaged Arshile Gorky as an instructor, probably the school's most prominent teacher. Another instructor was Harvey Dunn, whose comments were captured by a student during one five-hour class session and were published in 1934 in a slim volume titled An Evening in the Classroom. For some years the school held a summer session in Eastport, Maine. After nearly 20 years of operation, the school closed in 1944.

The school has no relationship to the Grand Central Academy of Art, despite the similarity in name and a shared humanist perspective. The academy, also in New York City, was established by the Institute of Classical Architecture and Classical America (ICA&CA), founded as two separate nonprofit organizations in 1991 and 1968.

== Alumni ==
- Charles Addams
- James E. Allen
- Revington Arthur
- Tore Asplund
- Clare Bice
- Hans Burkhardt
- Pruett Carter
- John Clymer
- Jack Coggins
- Stuart Davis
- John Dehner
- Gerald Curtis Delano
- Frank DuMond
- John Philip Falter
- Arnold Friberg
- Robert F. Gault, AWS
- Mary Goldsmith
- Arshile Gorky
- Edmund Greacen
- Molly Guion
- James Gordon Irving
- Bob Kane
- Willem de Kooning
- Arthur Roy Mitchell
- F. Luis Mora
- Walter Tandy Murch
- Roselle Osk
- Frank Panabaker
- Alex Raymond
- Frank J. Reilly
- Ken Riley
- Norman Rockwell
- Ednah Root
- Arthur Sarnoff
- Norman Saunders
- Harold Von Schmidt
- Ethel Schwabacher
- Saul Tepper
- Emmett Watson
- Stow Wengenroth
