= Hovsep Pushman =

Armenian-American painter

Hovsep Pushman Յովսէփ Փուշման
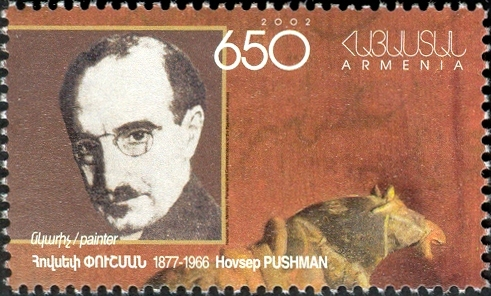
- Born: May 9, 1877; Dikranagerd (Diyarbakir), Ottoman Empire
- Died: February 13, 1966 (aged 88); New York City, United States
- Occupation: artist
- Children: 2

Hovsep Pushman (Armenian: Յովսէփ Փուշման; May 9, 1877 – February 13, 1966) was an American artist of Armenian background. He was known for his contemplative still lifes and sensitive portraits of women, often in exotic dress. He was most closely associated during his lifetime with the Grand Central Art Galleries, which represented him from its opening in 1922 until his death in 1966.

== Life ==
Hovsep Pushman was born and grew up in the town of Dikranagerd in the Ottoman Empire, where his family, originally "Pushmanian," was in the carpet business. Pushman showed artistic ability early, and at age 11 was the youngest student ever admitted to Istanbul's Imperial School of Fine Arts.

In 1896, Pushman's family emigrated to Chicago, where he studied Chinese culture, immersing himself in Asian art, and began to teach at the age of 17. He then moved to Paris and studied at the Académie Julian under Jules Joseph Lefebvre, Tony Robert-Fleury and Adolphe Déchenaud. Pushman exhibited his work at the Salon des Artistes Français, where he won medals in 1914 and 1921. Pushman returned to the United States in 1914, and in 1916 moved to Riverside, California, living at the city's Mission Inn until 1919. There he accepted some portrait commissions, including one that still hangs at the inn. In 1918 Pushman and a group of California painters founded the Laguna Beach Art Association; the same year he was awarded the California Art Club's Ackerman Prize.

After his time in California Pushman spent several years in Paris. He opened his own studio in 1921 and, with the encouragement of Robert-Fleury, concentrated his efforts on exotic portraits and still lifes of carefully arranged objects he had collected. According to James Cox, former director of the Grand Central Art Galleries, which represented Pushman for much of his life:

[Pushman's] paintings typically featured oriental idols, pottery and glassware, all glowing duskily as if illuminated by candlelight. They were symbolic, spiritual paintings, and were sometimes accompanied by readings, which help explain their allegorical significance. Most important, they were exquisitely beautiful, executed with technical precision.

In 1923, Pushman returned yet again to the United States and settled in New York City. His connection to the Grand Central Art Galleries began when he befriended Erwin Barrie, who once managed Carson Pirie Scott's art collection. Barrie introduced the artist to Walter Leighton Clark, who was in the process of establishing the Galleries. When Clark secured space in New York City's Grand Central Terminal, Barrie was hired as director and he encouraged Pushman to join the Grand Central Art Galleries. Pushman set up his studio in the Carnegie Hall building, where he created the remarkable works he showed at the Galleries:

Erwin Barrie maintained a separate velvet-walled salon for the exclusive use of Pushman. The only illumination allowed on his paintings were specially designed reflector lights attached to the rear of his carefully selected antique frames. The 'Pushman Room' is a legend in the American art world.

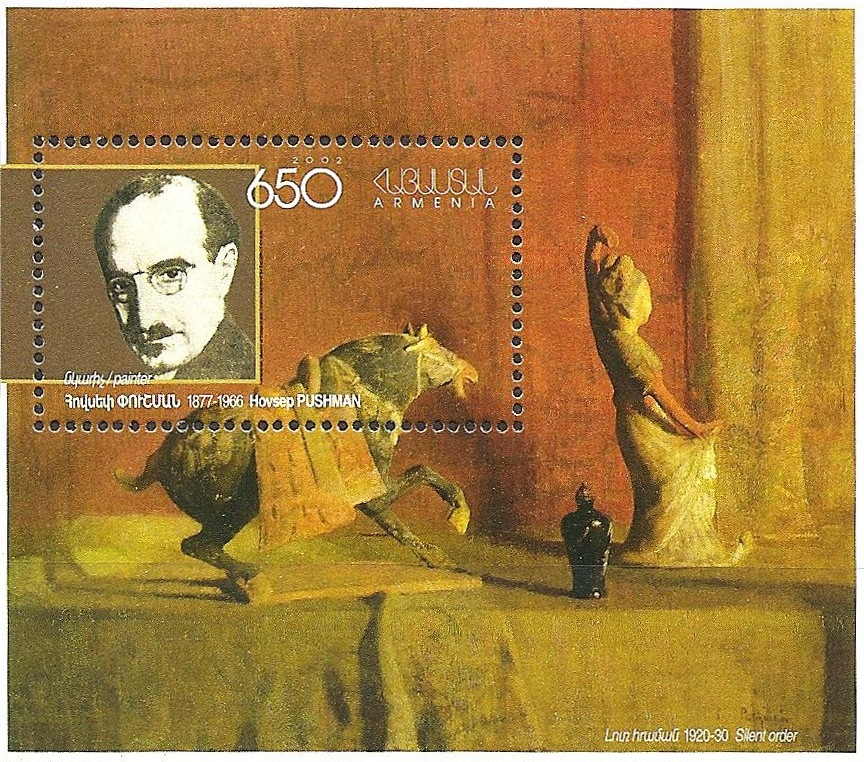
Pushman and his work The Silent order on a 2002 Armenian stamp

In 1932, Pushman was honored with a one-man show at the Galleries. Sixteen paintings were on display and all sold the opening day. The prices ranged from $3,500 up to $10,000 (the equivalent of more than $150,000 in 2009). The same year his painting The Daughter of the Sheykh, which had won a silver medal in Paris in 1921, was purchased by the Metropolitan Museum of Art. The winner of the 1936 art drawing at the Grand Central Art Galleries, Walter S. Gifford of AT&T, selected a Pushman still life of a Chinese statuette.

The 1940s and 1950s brought controversy and change to Pushman's world. In 1940 he sued the New York Graphic Society for reproducing a painting without his permission. While initially the ruling went against the painter, it was eventually reversed; the decision now protects artists' creative works. He had often turned down buyers interested in his work, reportedly once refusing an offer of $6,000 for a small canvas; in 1942 became only the second painter in 117 years to refuse entry into the National Academy. In 1958 the Grand Central Art Galleries, which had been Pushman's home since they opened in 1923, were forced out of the Grand Central Terminal. Eighty-one-year-old Pushman was present at the final reception at the Galleries' Terminal location, which was attended by more than 400 people.

Pushman died on February 13, 1966, in New York City. Three months later, Hulia Shaljian Pushman, his widow, followed him.

== Legacy ==
For more than two decades after Hovsep Pushman's death his sons, Arsene and Armand, preserved their father's studio intact. All of Pushman's objects, carpets, antiques, and paintings stayed until the last of the family's heirs died around 1990.

Pushman's paintings are in the collections of many major museums, including the Metropolitan Museum of Art, Boston's Museum of Fine Arts, the Seattle Art Museum, the San Diego Art Institute, the Houston Art Museum, the Rockford Art Museum, and the Minneapolis Institute of Arts.

== Gallery ==
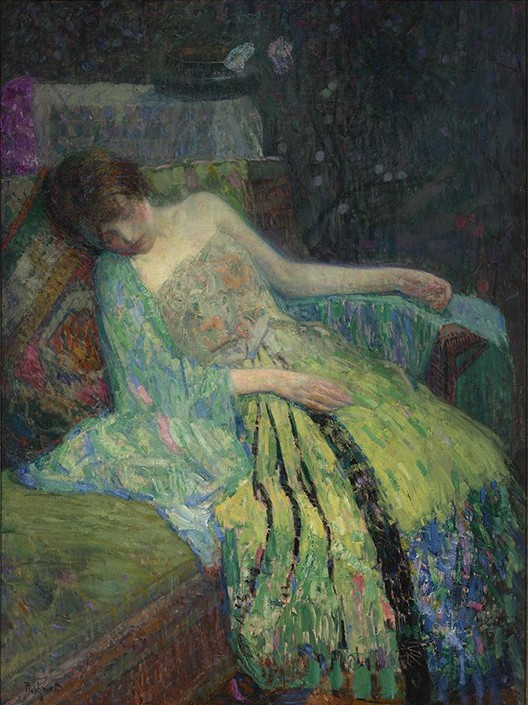
Hour of Rest, ca. 1915, Milwaukee Art Museum

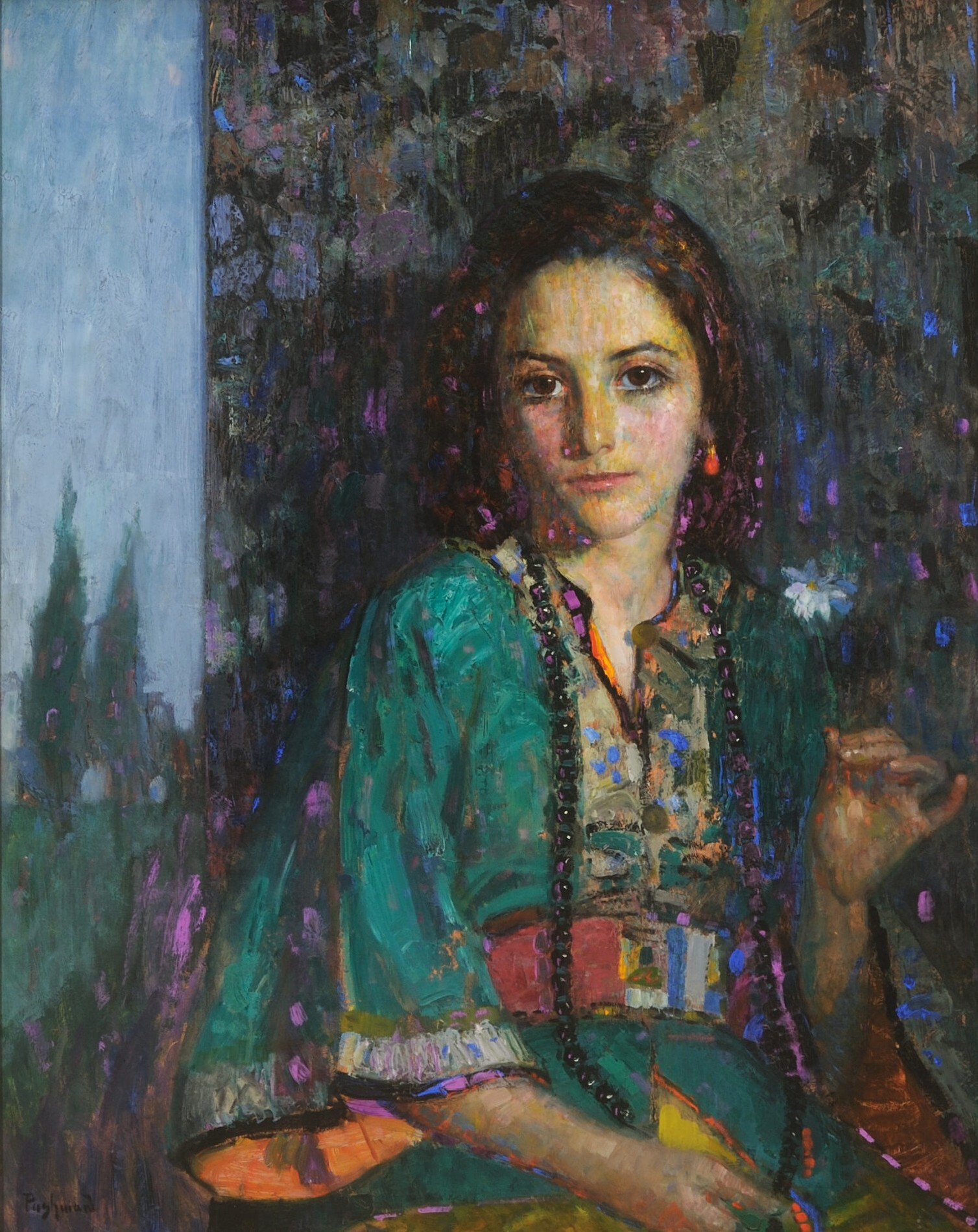
L'Espérance, ca. 1916, Woodrow Wilson House

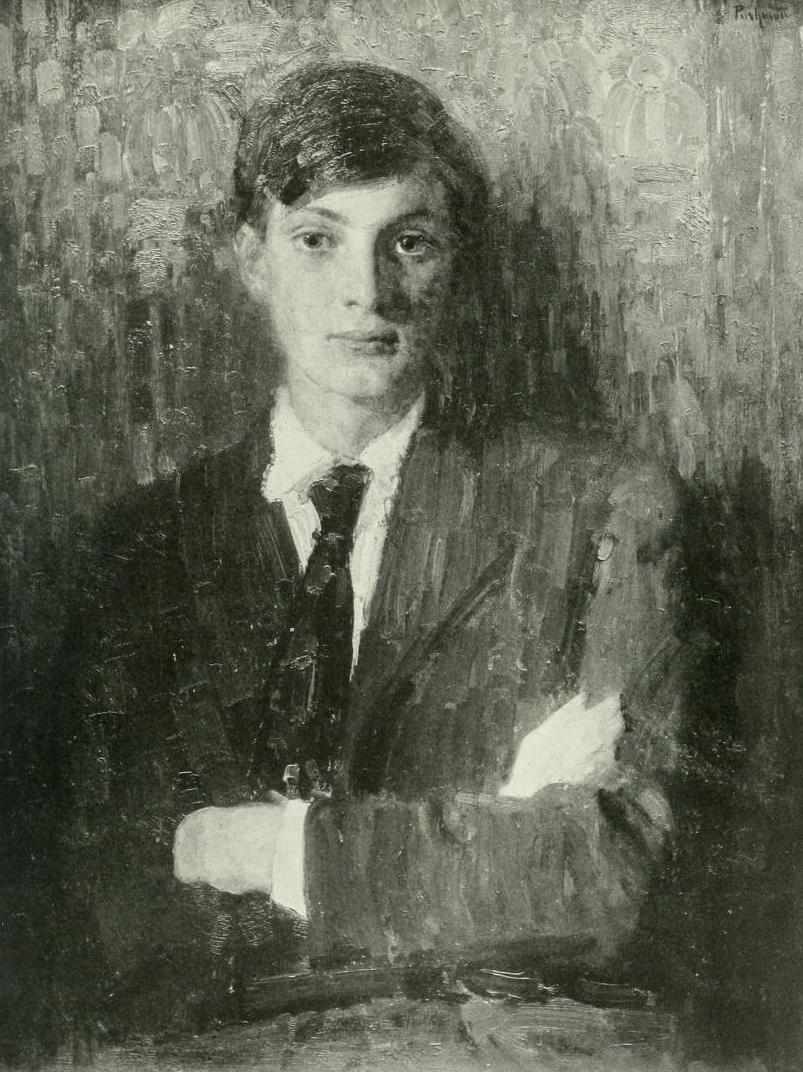
My Son, Arsene, ca. 1919, private collection

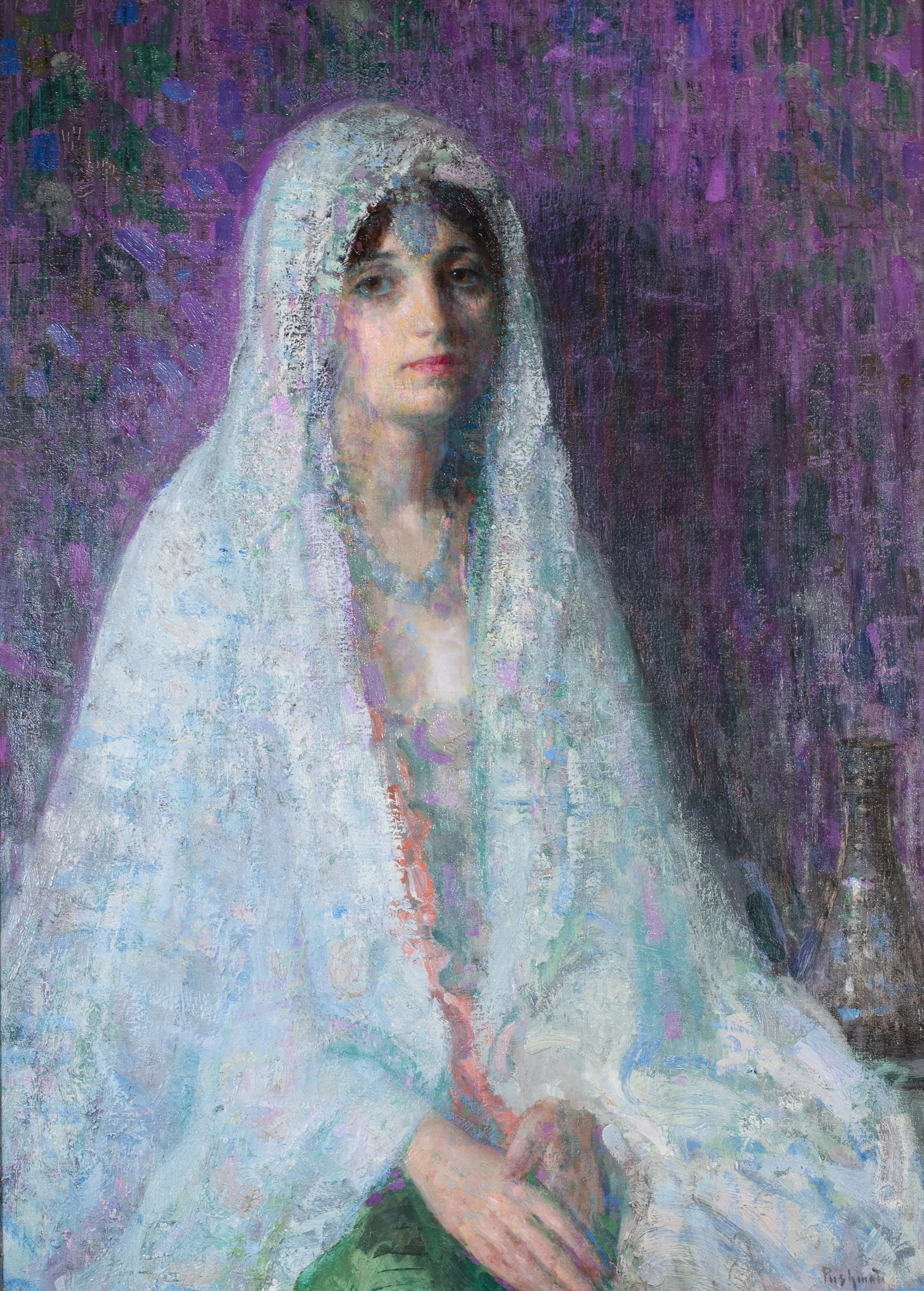
The Rose of Shiraz, ca. 1919, Nashville Parthenon

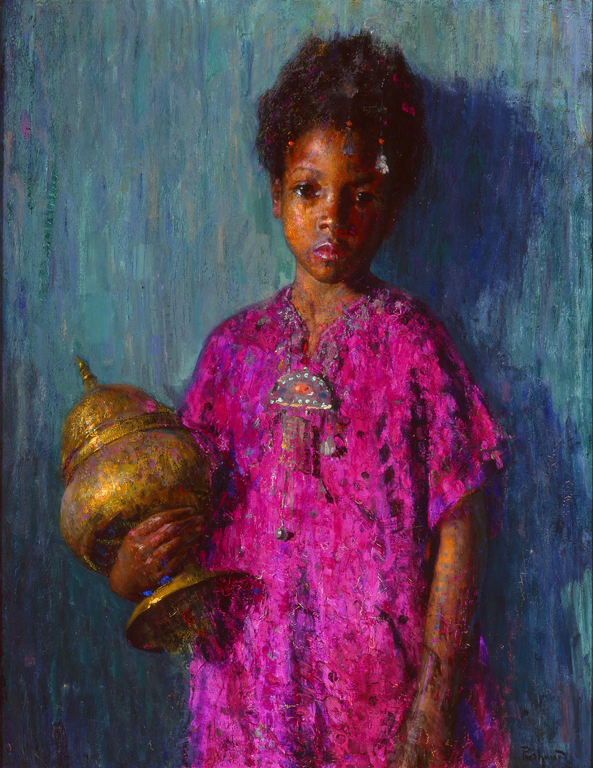
The Incense Burner, before 1921, Milwaukee Art Museum
