= Tore Asplund =

Swedish-born American painter (1903–1977)

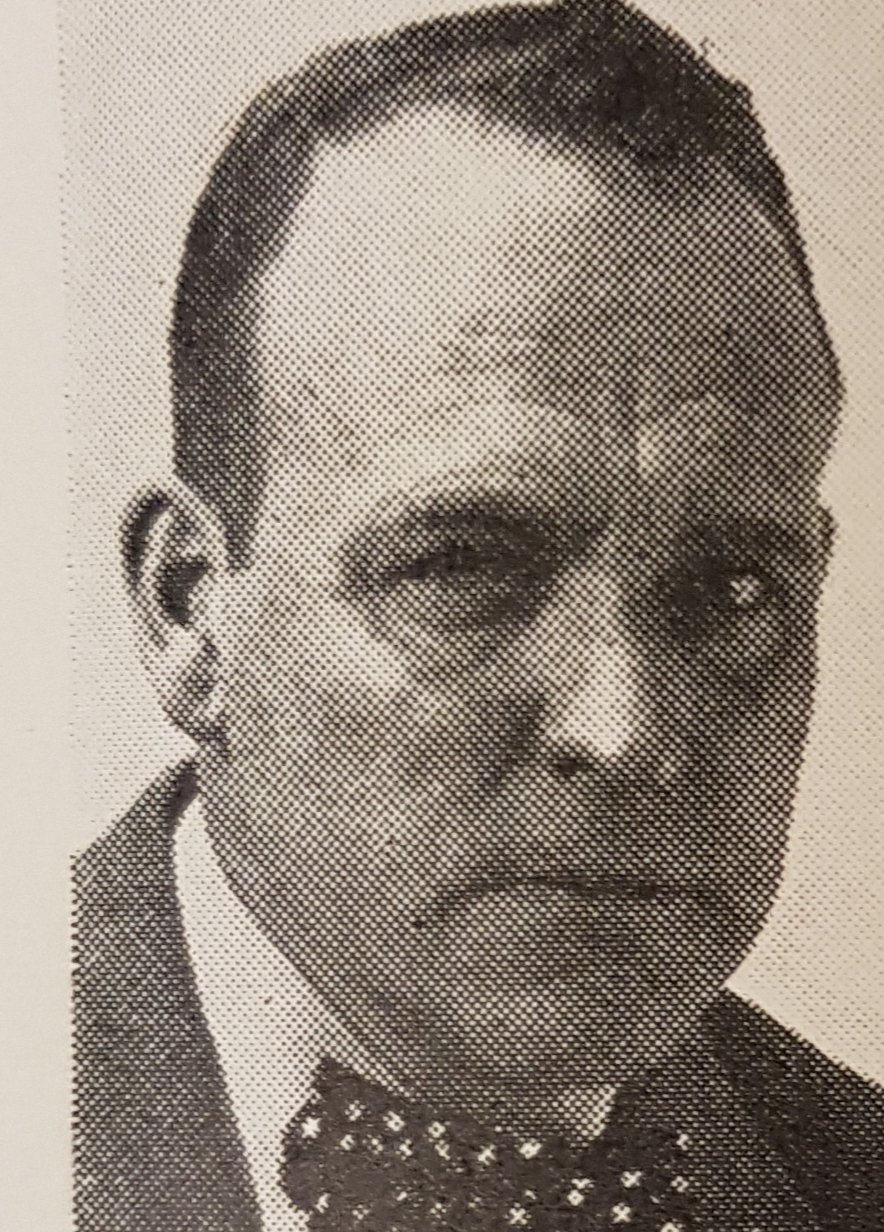
- Born: Tore Arvid Asplund; July 16, 1903; Stockholm, Sweden
- Died: December 31, 1977 (aged 74); Miami, Florida, US
- Education: Art Students League of New York, Grand Central School of Art
- Occupations: Painter, watercolorist

Tore Arvid Asplund (1903 – 1977) was a Swedish-born American painter and watercolorist. He spent most of his life in New York City.

== Life and career ==
Tore Asplund was born July 16, 1903, in Stockholm, Sweden. He was the son of Dagmar (née Moltrecht) and singer Arvid Asplund. The family moved to the United States when he was one year old, and he was raised in New York City. In 1930, he became a naturalized citizen in the United States.

He studied at the Art Students League of New York, and Grand Central School of Art.

During World War II, Asplund served both as a soldier and a front-line artist where he painted pictures while the landing was underway at Omaha Beach under fire.

His artwork consists mainly of landscapes and portraits done in either oil paint or watercolor. Asplund was a member of the National Academy of Design, and became an Associate National Academician (ANA) in 1949, and National Academician (NA) in 1951. He was also a member of the Salmagundi Club.

Asplund exhibited with the American Watercolor Society in 1938–1939, and the Pennsylvania Academy of the Fine Arts in 1938. Asplund has his work in museum collections, including at the Asheville Art Museum.

Asplund struggled with alcoholism. He died of suicide by hanging at age 74 on New Year's Eve on December 31, 1977, in Miami, Florida.
