= Famous Writers School =

1970 correspondence course scandal

- Industry: Education
- Genre: fiction, non-fiction, advertising, and business writing
- Founded: 1961
- Founder: Bennett Cerf, Gordon Carroll, and Albert Dorne
- Fate: bankruptcy (1972)
- Headquarters: Westport, Connecticut
- Key people: Faith Baldwin, John Caples, Bruce Catton, Bennett Cerf, Mignon G. Eberhart, Paul Engle, Bergen Evans, Clifton Fadiman, Rudolf Flesch, Phyllis McGinley, J. D. Ratcliff, Rod Serling, Max Shulman, Red Smith, Mark Wiseman

The Famous Writers School was an educational institution that ran a correspondence course for writers in the 1960s and 1970s. Founded in 1961 by Bennett Cerf, Gordon Carroll, and Albert Dorne, it became the subject of a scandal after a 1970 exposé by Jessica Mitford, who noted the school's questionable academic and business practices.

== Founding ==
The school was founded by Bennett Cerf, a Random House editor and well-known television personality, Gordon Carroll, an occasional editor for Reader's Digest, and Albert Dorne, an illustrator whose school, the Famous Artists School, owned Famous Writers. It began operations in 1961, based in Westport, Connecticut. The ubiquitous advertising copy for the school, which was often found in the back of magazines, listed the following writers (who were also stockholders) as the school's "Guiding Faculty": Faith Baldwin, John Caples, Bruce Catton, Bennett Cerf, Mignon G. Eberhart, Paul Engle, Bergen Evans, Clifton Fadiman, Rudolf Flesch, Phyllis McGinley, J. D. Ratcliff, Rod Serling, Max Shulman, Red Smith and Mark Wiseman. Cerf is quoted in the advertisements as saying: "We approached representative writers, the best we could get in each field: fiction, advertising, sports writing, television. The idea was to give the school some prestige."

Between 1960 and 1969, revenue from tuition increased from $7 million to $48 million, and the stock increased in value from $5 to $40. Radio spots featuring Guiding Faculty, including Baldwin and Eberhardt, being interviewed by Cerf were aired. By 1964, they were offering four different programs: fiction, non-fiction, advertising, and business writing.

== Practices ==
To enter the program, the course required students to submit aptitude tests, which were almost uniformly accepted. The advertisements implied that the celebrity faculty would evaluate the student's tests, a statement that Bennett Cerf, a leader of the group, admitted was false. Once a student's test was accepted, they were sent a letter filled with praise, suggesting that "you couldn't consider breaking into writing at a better time than today. Everything indicates that the demand for good prose is growing much faster than the supply of trained talent." Mitford noted that the complete opposite was true at the time, and that "the average free-lance earns just over $3000 a year." Students were required to sign a contract with the school. Cerf noted that "once somebody has signed a contract with Famous Writers he can't get out of it, but that's true with every business in the country."

Assignments were graded by a staff of fifty, including some well-respected free-lance writers. The comments they provided on students' papers were described as "formulaic, often identical, responses" and as "good as you'd get from a mediocre professor in a so-so creative writing program." The cost was also "about fifteen times" the cost of correspondence courses offered by universities. Students who signed up for the course were provided with "four hefty 'two-toned, buckram bound' volumes with matching loose-leaf binders for the lessons."

At the time of Mitford's reporting, the school's enrollment was 65,000 students, each of whom was paying $785 to $900 for the three-year course. Mitford reported a high dropout rate (between 66 and 90%), which she concluded was partly responsible for the school's financial success. The school employed about 800 salesmen throughout the country working on a "straight commission basis." In 1970, about 2000 veterans were signed up for the program through the GI bill at the taxpayer's expense.

== Scandal ==
The school came to the attention of Mitford after her husband, Robert Treuhaft, a lawyer in Oakland, California, began representing a 72-year-old woman who emptied her bank account to sign up for the course and later attempted to get a refund before the course had begun. Mitford began researching the school, touring the campus in Westport, interviewing members of the Guiding Faculty including Bennett Cerf, and placing advertisements looking for students of the school who could share their experiences. Several of the Guiding Faculty attempted to defend the school's practices, with Faith Baldwin saying "Oh, that's just one of those things about advertising.... Anyone with common sense would know that the fifteen of us are much too busy to read the manuscripts the students send in." Mitford's article on the school, "Let Us Now Appraise Famous Writers", was originally commissioned by McCall's, but it declined to print it for fear of offending Bennett Cerf. The Atlantic Monthly printed the piece in its July 1970 issue. (Mitford was already well known for her 1963 investigative book about the American funeral industry, The American Way of Death.)

== Aftermath ==
When the piece was published, more than 300 students sent letters to the Atlantic Monthly who "felt they had been swindled and who wanted to get out of the contract." Mitford was invited onto numerous television programs, her article was read into the legislative record in Utah and attorneys general in several states initiated lawsuits against the school. Officials in Indiana and Washington sent reprints of the article to every high school counselor and principal. A member of Congress entered the entire article in the Congressional Record and convinced the Federal Trade Commission to investigate. The school's stock steadily declined, and in 1972, the school filed for bankruptcy, although Mitford noted in 1974 that the school was "creeping back." According to Bill Vogelsang, the nephew of Mignon Eberhart, Cerf had warned her, and presumably other members of the Guided Faculty, to sell their stock in the school, which she allegedly refused to do.

From at least 2002 until mid-2015, a group in Wilton, Connecticut, calling itself the Famous Writers School, still existed, selling a course and set of books identical to those of the original Famous Writers School.

== In popular culture ==
In the early 1970s the National Lampoon published a parody of the Famous Writers School teaching material. Written by Michael O'Donoghue, it was titled "How to Write Good", with a real quote at the beginning from Eliot Foster, Director of Admissions, Famous Writers School.

A novel by Steven Carter entitled Famous Writers School was published in 2006. It dealt with a man who runs a correspondence course and consists of lessons he mails to his students and the writing samples they send back.

== See also ==
- Famous Artists School
