= Pushman v. New York Graphic Society, Inc. =

Pushman v. New York Graphic Society
- Court: New York Court of Appeals
- Full case name: Hovsep Pushman v. New York Graphic Society, Inc.
- Argued: December 9 1941
- Decided: January 15 1942
- Citation: 287 N.Y. 302; 39 N.E.2d 249; 52 U.S.P.Q. 273

Case history
- Prior history: Judgment for defendant, Supreme Court; affirmed on appeal, 28 N.Y.S.2d 711 (N.Y. App. Div. 1941)

Holding
- The transfer of the only tangible embodiment of a work of authorship presumptively transfers the copyright. New York Supreme Court Appellate Division affirmed.

Court membership
- Chief judge: Irving Lehman
- Associate judges: Albert Conway, Charles S. Desmond, Edward R. Finch, Harlan Watson Rippey, John T. Loughran, Edmund H. Lewis

Case opinions
- Majority: Desmond, joined by Lehman, Loughran, Finch, Rippey, Lewis, Conway

Laws applied
- Abrogated by
- Copyright Act of 1976

Pushman v. New York Graphic Society, 287 N.Y. 302 (1942), was a case decided by the New York Court of Appeals that held that, while the copyright in a work of authorship is distinct from the tangible embodiment of the work, if the only tangible embodiment of the work is transferred the copyright is also presumptively transferred.

== Factual background ==
The plaintiff Hovsep Pushman was an artist that finished a work entitled When Autumn is Here in 1930. That same year, Pushman gave the painting to Grand Central Art Galleries to arrange a sale of the work. Upon giving the painting to Grand Central Art Galleries, Pushman did not negotiate any reservation reproduction rights. Grand Central Art Galleries sold the painting to the University of Illinois for $3,600. The painting remained with the University until it sold reproduction rights to the defendant, New York Graphic Society. Pushman sued for an injunction against reproduction of the painting. The defendant moved to dismiss the complaint, and the motion was granted by the trial court and affirmed by the New York Supreme Court, Appellate Division.

== Decision ==
The court first recognized that the copyright in a work exists separately from the tangible embodiment of the work. But on the authority of the case Parton v. Prang, the court held that to reserve the copyright when the sole tangible embodiment of the work is transferred, the author must make an express reservation at the time of the transfer. The court held that Pushman's sale was unconditional because he did not expressly reserve any rights at the time of the transfer.

== Impact ==
The holding in Pushman created what was subsequently termed the Pushman presumption, which required an author to expressly reserve rights when transferring the chattel that embodied a work or risk transferring the rights as well. The holding in Pushman was criticized and subject to various statutory and judicial limitations.

Pushman was abrogated by § 202 of the Copyright Act of 1976, which establishes that the transfer of a tangible embodiment of a copyrighted work does not of itself transfer the copyright.
