= Robert F. Gault =

- Born: Robert Franklin Gault; December 15, 1898; Westport, Connecticut, U.S.
- Died: February 22, 1977 (aged 78); Westport, Connecticut, U.S.
- Resting place: Willowbrook Cemetery
- Education: Williston Academy
- Occupation: Painter

Robert Franklin Gault known as Robert F. Gault (December 15, 1898 - February 22, 1977) was an American Impressionist painter and water-colorist from Westport, Connecticut.

== Biography ==
Gault was born December 15, 1898, in Westport, Connecticut to Robert S. Gault (1865-1915) and Mabel J. Gault (née Warren; 1870–1944). His grandfather was Robert Gault (1833-1921) who came to America in 1856, aged 13 from Northern Ireland, and founded the Gault Family Companies (then Gault Brothers) in Westport in 1863. He was born and died in the house of his parents at 132 South Compo Road in Westport. Since he was the third 'Robert' living in the town he was often referred to as 'Frank' or 'Frankie' during his school years. He attended Staples High School and graduated from the Williston Academy in Northampton, Massachusetts.

In 1917 he attended the Cincinnati Art Museum Academy. Later he continued studies at the Grand Central School of Art in New York City He was elected a member of the American Watercolor Society in 1966 and during the course of his career exhibited at the Wadsworth Atheneum and across New York City, where he worked as a commercial artist.
