= Johnstone and Cushing =

American advertising agency

- Industry: Advertising
- Founded: 1936
- Founder: Tom Johnstone; Samuel Dewey Cushing
- Fate: defunct (1962)
- Headquarters: New York City, U.S.

Johnstone and Cushing was an American advertising agency that specialized in comic strip-style advertisements that used many prominent cartoonists and commercial artists of the time. Until its dissolution in 1962, the New York City-based company provided ads for such companies as AT&T, General Foods, Nestle, and RC Cola, drawn by artists including Milton Caniff, Albert Dorne, Lou Fine, Neal Adams and Alex Kotsky. The agency's co-founder, Tom Johnstone, had become acquainted with numerous cartoonists while employed earlier by the newspaper the New York World.

Tom Johnstone and Samuel Dewy Cushing met in the year 1930. They developed a friendship after meeting at a Broadway show called Artists and Models, where Johnstone was part of the production and Cushing was one of the investors of the show. Sam Cushing saw the success with Johnstone's art agency, so he suggested that his son Jack Cushing see Johnstone for a job. Johnstone soon made Jack Cushing a partner, and Johnstone and Cushing was established.
