= Albert Dorne =

American artist (1904–1965)

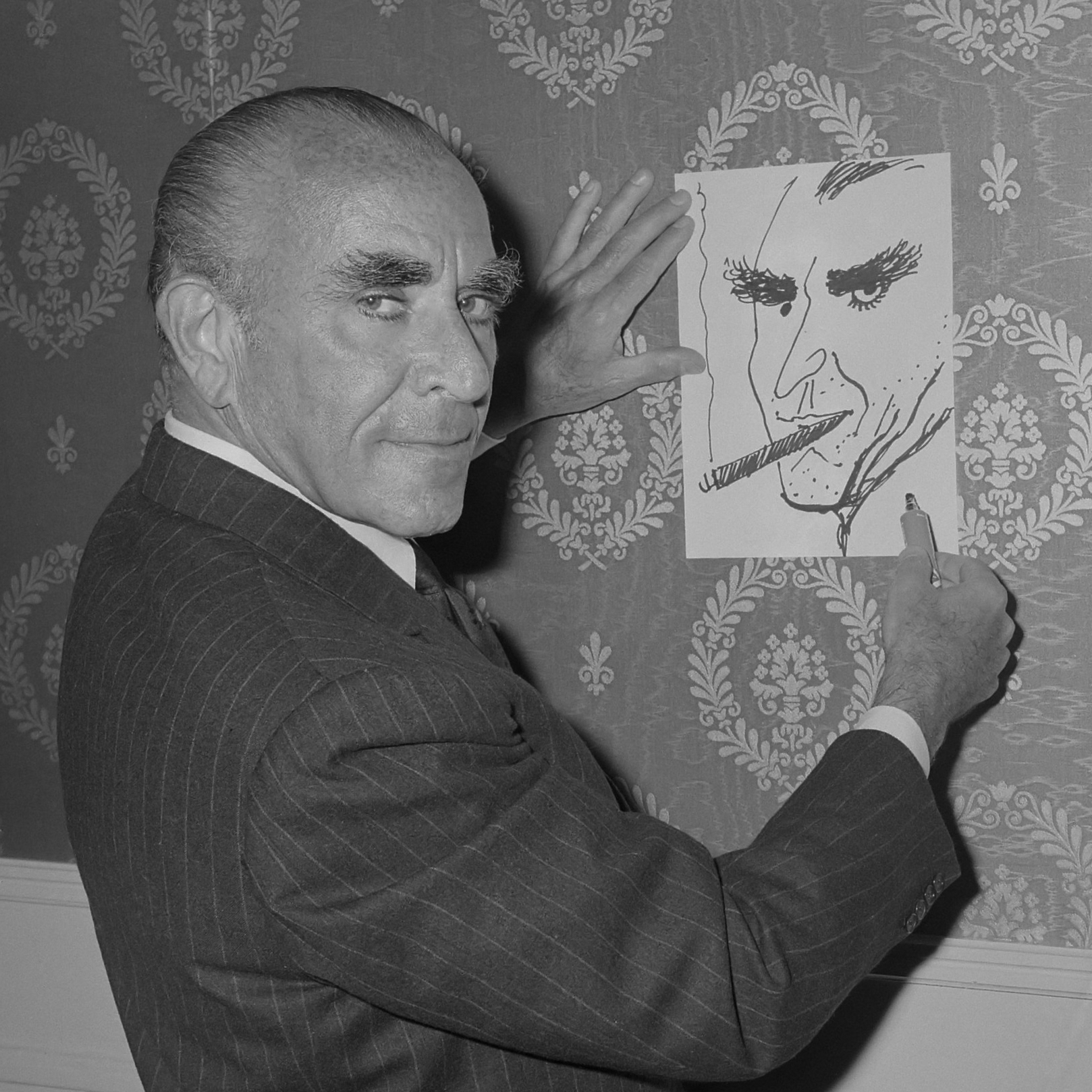
- Albert Dorne (1963)
- Born: February 7, 1904; New York City, U.S.
- Died: December 15, 1965 (aged 59); University Hospital, New York City

Albert Dorne (February 7, 1904 - December 15, 1965) was an American illustrator and entrepreneur, and was co-founder of correspondence schools for aspiring artists, photographers, and writers. Dorne was co-founder of the Code of Ethics and Fair Practices of the Profession of Commercial Art and Illustration.

== Biography ==
Dorne was born in the slums of New York City's East Side, and had a troubled childhood plagued with tuberculosis and heart problems. He would cut classes to study art in the museums, eventually quitting school altogether to support his family. After numerous jobs such as managing a newsstand and acting as an office boy, as well as a short professional boxing career, Dorne began working in advertising.

He apprenticed as a letterer with then-letterer and future prominent illustrator Saul Tepper before beginning a five-year stint at the commercial art studio of Alexander Rice. He left the studio to begin a freelance career and soon his illustrations started appearing in such magazines as Life, Collier's, and The Saturday Evening Post, and by 1943 was featured on the cover of American Artist magazine, recognized as "one of the best and highest paid in the field of advertising illustration." He frequently worked for the Johnstone and Cushing advertising agency. Some of his advertising art was also presented in comic strip format.

Dorne was president of the New York Society of Illustrators in 1947–48. In 1948, he conceived the idea of a correspondence school for art, and recruited eleven other well-known artists and illustrators affiliated with the Society of Illustrators, including Norman Rockwell, to found the Famous Artists School. In 1961, he helped found the Famous Photographers School and the Famous Writers School, based on similar principles. All three schools were based in Westport, Connecticut, and by 1963, boasted more than 50,000 students in the U.S. and 54 foreign countries, with a gross income of $10 million.

Dorne influenced the work of artists including John Buscema, Al Avison, and Arthur Suydam.

In 1956, Dorne donated his pictorial resource file of over 500,000 items to the Westport Public Library. The collection is still in use today. In 1964, the University of Bridgeport Department of Art endowed the Albert Dorne Professorship in Drawing.

== Awards ==
- 1953: New York Art Directors Club — Gold Medal for "distinguished career"
- 1958: Honorary Doctor of Fine Arts, Adelphi College
- 1963: Horatio Alger Award for Achievement, American Schools and Colleges Association, Inc.
