= Revington Arthur =

American painter and educator (1908–1986)

Revington Jessup Arthur
- Born: April 2, 1907; Stamford, Connecticut, U.S.
- Died: September 11, 1986 (aged 79)
- Education: Art Students League of New York, Grand Central School of Art, Eastport Summer School of Art
- Occupations: Artist, educator
- Years active: 1920s–1978
- Known for: Oil paintings, Watercolors, Graphic design

Revington Jessup Arthur (April 2, 1907 – September 11, 1986), was an American artist and educator. He is known for abstract oil paintings, watercolors, and graphic design. He taught at the Chautauqua Art Summer School from 1956 until 1986.

== Early life and education ==
Revington Arthur was born in 1907 in the Glenbrook neighborhood of Stamford, Connecticut, where he was also raised. His father was an engineer. He began painting from an early age.

Arthur studied at the Art Students League of New York, the Eastport Summer School of Art, and the Grand Central School of Art; under Kimon Nicolaïdes, George Luks, and George Pearse Ennis. Arthur had been taught painting for three years by abstract expressionist artist Arshile Gorky at the Grand Central School of Art, from 1927 until 1929.

== Career ==
Originally relying on more traditional themes, Arthur's art became significantly more abstract by the early 1950s, with many pieces being influenced by space travel, technology, and the Cold War. By 1932 he was professionally displaying his work in New York City; and by 1957, he had held more than 22 solo art exhibitions. He primarily lived in New Canaan, Connecticut, with summers in Chautauqua, New York.

The 1945 "Annual Exhibition of Contemporary American Painting" at the Whitney Museum of American Art included Arthur's work. His artwork and exhibitions were reviewed in ARTnews in 1946 and 1953; and by Art Digest (now Arts Magazine) in 1984. In the 1946 review, Arthur was working in a "semi-Cubism" painting style. In the 1953 review, there was an abrupt change in Arthur's painting style, with a push towards flattened abstraction.

Arthur and Miriam Broudy were the co-founders of the New England and National Print Show (now called the Art of the Northeast) at Silvermine Guild of Artists in 1949 in New Canaan, Connecticut. It has been one of the nation's preeminent art competitions on the East Coast, with many of the awardees reaching high levels of success in their art careers.

From 1956 until his death in 1986, Arthur was head of the Chautauqua Art Summer School in Chautauqua, New York, where he frequently taught painting and drawing classes and gave lectures. He also taught art appreciation classes, and he taught at New York University. His students included psychiatrist Karl Menninger, Joan Seiler, Clifford Davis, Vadim Filimonov, Thorton W. Whipple, Herb Jackson, and Anthony H. Horan. He had an eccentric teaching wardrobe of bermuda shorts, sandals, and bucket hat. The Chautauqua Art Centre (now known as Chautauqua Art Association Gallery) was founded in 1956 by Arthur; which since 1958 hosts the Chautauqua National Annual Exhibition (now known as the Chautauqua Annual Exhibition of Contemporary Art).

== Death and legacy ==
Arthur died on September 11, 1986, at the age of 79. After his death, the "Revington Arthur Award for Excellence in Painting" was given to artists.

Arthur's work is in museum collections including the Buffalo AKG Art Museum, Walker Art Center, and the Brooklyn Museum. The Solomon R. Guggenheim Museum Archives holds his artist files, and the New-York Historical Society holds "[c]atalogs, brochures and invitations for exhibitions held at the Babcock Galleries" by Arthur among many other artists. The Chautauqua Institution archives has photographs of Arthur with his students.
