= Grand Central Art Galleries =

Coordinates: 40.7528°N 73.9768°W

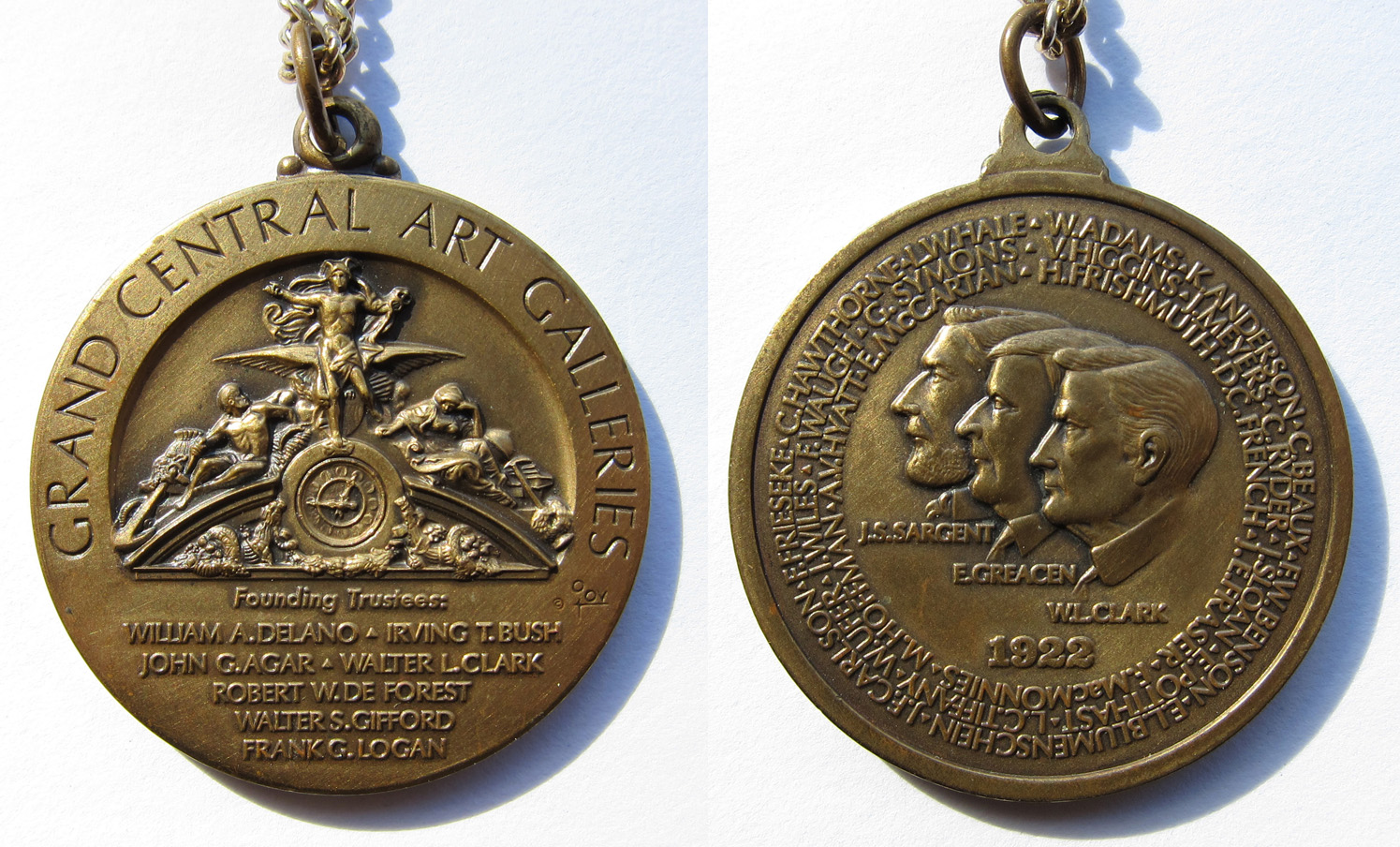
- Medal commemorating the founding of the Grand Central Art Galleries
- Established: 1922
- Dissolved: 1994
- Location: New York City, New York, United States
- Type: Art gallery
- Directors: Erwin S. Barrie, James D. Cox
- President: Walter Leighton Clark

The Grand Central Art Galleries were the exhibition and administrative space of the nonprofit Painters and Sculptors Gallery Association, an artists' cooperative established in 1922 by Walter Leighton Clark together with John Singer Sargent, Edmund Greacen, and others. Artists closely associated with the Grand Central Art Galleries included Hovsep Pushman, George de Forest Brush, and especially Sargent, whose posthumous show took place there in 1928.

The Galleries were active from 1923 until 1994. For 29 years they were located on the sixth floor of Grand Central Terminal in New York City. At their 1923 opening, the Galleries covered 14,000 square feet (1,300 m^{2}) and offered nine exhibition areas and a reception room, described as "the largest sales gallery of art in the world." In 1958 the Galleries moved to the second floor of the Biltmore Hotel, where they had six exhibition rooms and an office. They remained at the Biltmore for 23 years, until it was converted into an office building. The Galleries then moved to 24 West 57th Street, where they remained until they ceased activity.

In addition to their main offices, the Grand Central Art Galleries directed a number of other enterprises. They launched the Grand Central School of Art in 1923, opened a branch gallery at Fifth Avenue and 51st Street in 1933, and in 1947 established Grand Central Moderns to show non-figurative works. The Grand Central Art Galleries were also responsible for the creation, design, and construction of the United States Pavilion at the Venice Biennale.

== Origins ==
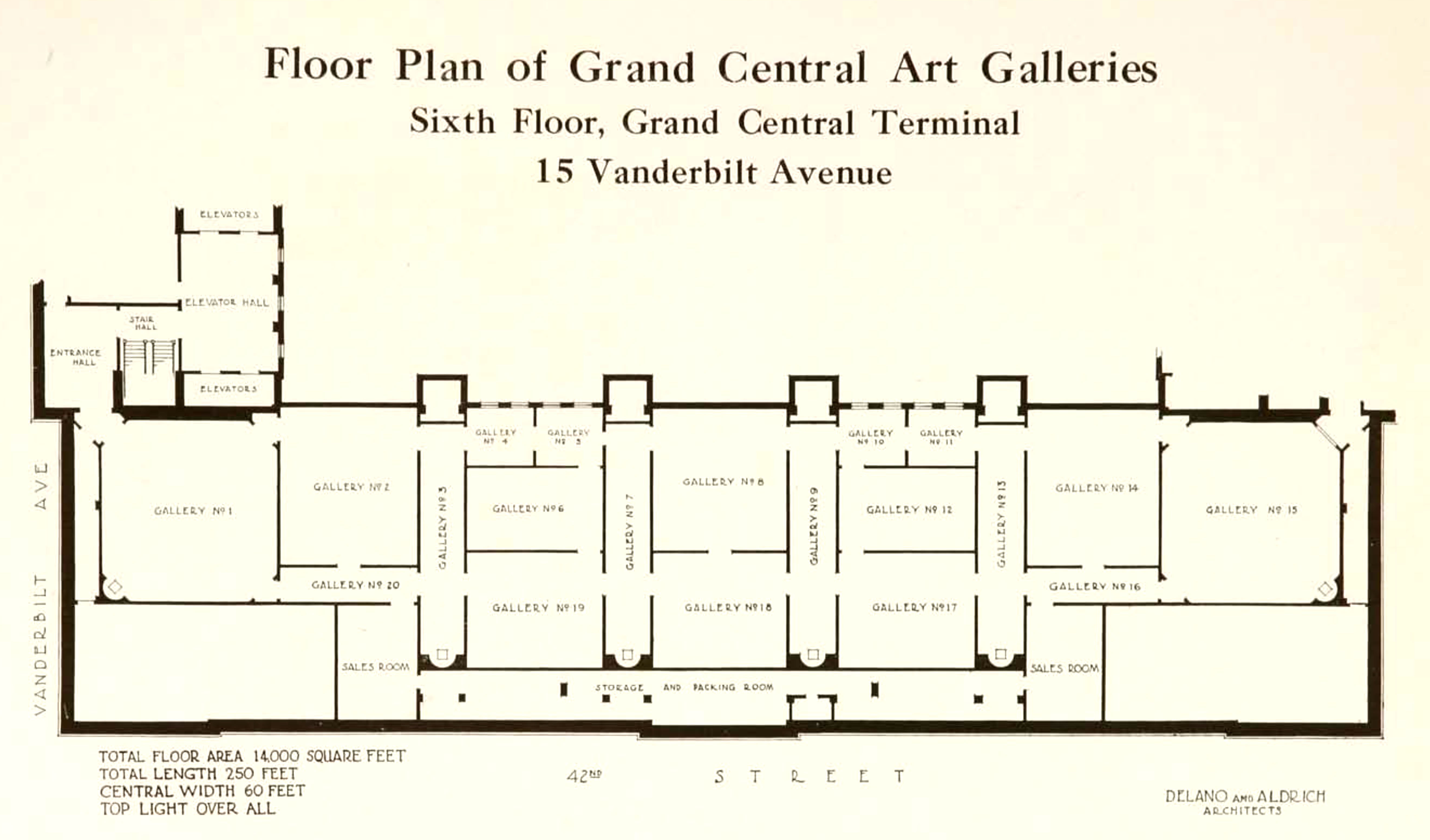
Floor plan of the Grand Central Art Galleries for their opening exhibition in 1923.

The Painters and Sculptors Gallery Association was established in 1922 by Walter Leighton Clark together with John Singer Sargent, Edmund Greacen, and others. As stated in the Galleries' 1934 catalog, their goal was to "give a broader field to American art; to exhibit in a larger way to a more numerous audience, not in New York alone but throughout the country, thus displaying to the world the inherent value which our art undoubtedly possesses."

The founders envisioned a nonprofit, cooperative organization, but one firmly supported by the best business principles Greacen, an artist, is credited with having suggested the Galleries' financial structure: Artists who wished to join were required to give a work of art each year for three years as an initiation fee, after which they became life members. Non-artists (referred to as "lay members") agreed to give a sum of money (initially $600, the equivalent of $11,256 in 2024) to purchase one of the donated works, but available only after the first year. As Clark wrote: "The beauty of this plan of operation is that it accomplishes results in a practical way and is free from the sting of charity because the artists are actually underwriting their own organization." Initial interest was strong, with many artists and lay members joining the new organization. "We had upward of one hundred names on each of the above lists," Clark wrote.

The original board of trustees consisted of Walter Sherman Gifford; the Galleries' architect, William Adams Delano; Robert W. DeForest, president of the Metropolitan Museum of Art; Frank Logan, vice-president of the Art Institute of Chicago; Irving T. Bush, president of the Bush Terminal Company; and artist and businessman Walter Leighton Clark. The association's charter and bylaws were written by Gifford and John G. Agar, president of the National Arts Club. Clark was elected president, DeForest vice-president, and Gifford became secretary and treasurer. Erwin S. Barrie, manager of the art collection of Carson Pirie Scott, was hired as director.

The board sought a location in Manhattan that was central and easily accessible. Through the support of Alfred Holland Smith, president of the New York Central Railroad, the top of the Grand Central Terminal was made available. The official street address was 15 Vanderbilt Avenue. The Painters and Sculptors Gallery Association signed a 10-year lease, and together with the railroad company, invested more than $100,000 in preparations. The Galleries extended over most of the terminal's sixth floor, 14,000 square feet (1,300 m^{2}), and offered eight main exhibition rooms, a foyer gallery, and a reception area. A total of 20 display rooms were to be created for what was intended to be "the largest sales gallery of art in the world." The architect was Delano, best known for designing Yale Divinity School's Sterling Quadrangle.

The Grand Central Art Galleries officially opened on March 23, 1923. The event featured paintings by Sargent, Charles W. Hawthorne, Cecilia Beaux, Wayman Adams, and Ernest Ipsen. Sculptors included Daniel Chester French, Herbert Adams, Robert Aitken, Gutzon Borglum, and Frederic MacMonnies, who showed a fountain, The Boy and the Fish. The gala event attracted 5,000 people and received a positive review from The New York Times:

"The initial exhibition, seen for its own sake, is a beauty. Every artist seems to have realized that it is an occasion for putting his best work forward, and his best work could not be more favorably shown to the public. Even the galleries of the newest museums are not quite so favorable."

In keeping with the founders' conception of the Galleries as a commercial as well as artistic organization, the majority of the works on display were for sale. Prices ranged from $100 to $10,000, the most expensive one being by Hawthorne; Sargent's contribution was valued at $5,000. By 1934 Clark estimated that sales were $500,000 to $600,000 a year. Total sales up to that year were approximately $4,000,000. Two-thirds of proceeds on commercial sales were distributed to artists.

== Members' Art Drawings ==
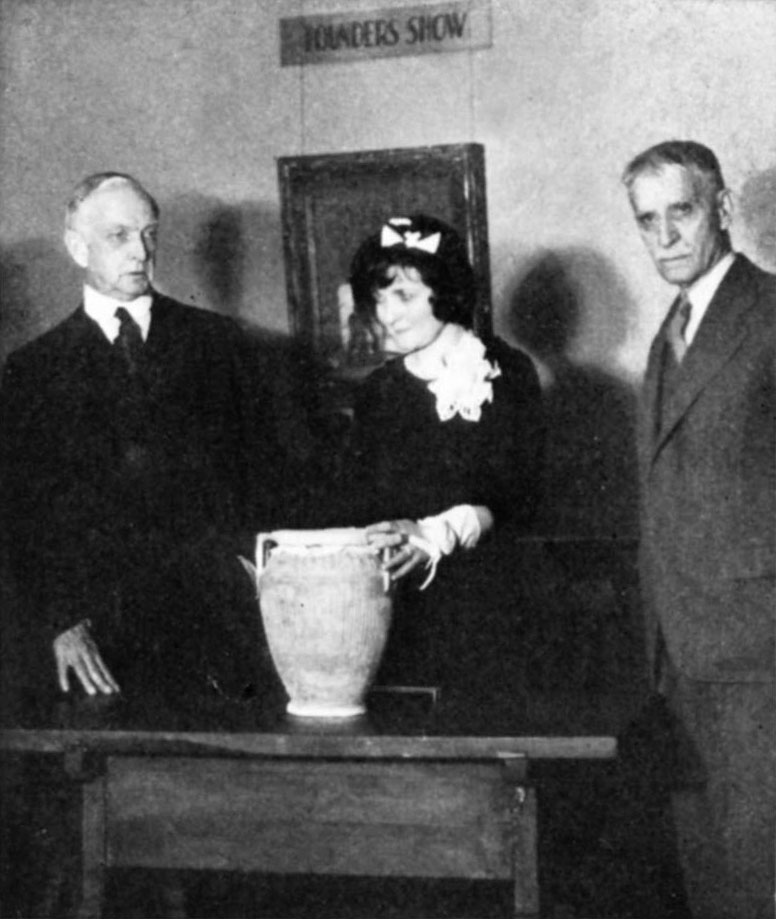
Walter Leighton Clark, Helen Holt Hawley, and Bruce Crane at the Grand Central Art Galleries' 1933 members' drawing.

The Grand Central Art Galleries were founded on the idea of a respectful and mutually beneficial relationship between artists and those interested in art. Artist members donated one work a year for three years as their initiation fee; lay members gave a yearly sum in return for a work of art after the first year's membership. Works donated by the artists were distributed to the lay members at an annual drawing. A yearly catalog indicated the works to be distributed at a drawing and reception at the gallery.

As described in the 1934 catalog, the procedure was as follows:

"[The drawing] will be accomplished by placing the name of each lay member on a slip of paper in a sealed jar which will be shaken thoroughly. Then before the entire audience the seal will be broken and a child will draw the names, one at a time, and they will be read aloud and entered on a list. The name first drawn will have first choice of all the contributed works of art. The second name drawn will have a free choice after number one has made his selection and the third name will then have the privilege of making his choice from all the works that remain, and so on until the last name."

Available works were placed on display prior to the drawing, and lay members were requested to "make a list of thirty choices, arranging same in the order of his preference." This pre-selection would allow the awarded paintings to be announced the evening of the drawing. Because of the wide range of works being offered, the drawing — and in particular, an early selection — was important.

- 1925: The name of Harold H. Swift, the Chicago meatpacker, was the first selected, and he chose John Singer Sargent's 1918 painting, Shoeing Cavalry Horses at the Front, worth $15,000 at the time.
- 1927: The first name selected was that of Henry W. Cannon, who chose H. Bolton Jones's landscape In the Berkshires.
- 1930: The slips with the members' names were selected by Nancy Clark Dunn, granddaughter of Walter Leighton Clark. The works that year were reportedly worth $100,000. The person whose name was first chosen selected Chauncey Ryder's River Road to Sheffield.
- 1936: The first name drawn was that of Walter S. Gifford, president of AT&T. He selected a Hovsep Pushman still life of a Chinese statuette.
- 1941: Works of 82 artist-members are distributed at the annual drawing. Film star Gloria Swanson presided, "dressed in a simple black costume with a large black hat." The first name drawn was that of Arthur B. Davis, president of the Aluminum Company of America; he chose H. Bolton Jones's painting The Shore. Eugene Frank of Columbia University was selected next, and he chose Hovsep Pushman's Fading Rose. The third name drawn was A.E. Clegg, president of the Kerr Steamship Company, who selected Frederick Judd Waugh's Invading Spindrift.

== Grand Central School of Art ==
A year after the Galleries opened the Painters and Sculptors Gallery Association established the Grand Central School of Art, which occupied 7,000 square feet (650 m^{2}) on the seventh floor of the east wing of the Grand Central Terminal. The school was directed by John Singer Sargent and Daniel Chester French; its first year teachers included painters Edmund Greacen, Wayman Adams, Jonas Lie, George Elmer Browne, Nicolai Fechin, and Sigurd Skou; sculptor Chester Beach; illustrator Dean Cornwell; costume designer Helen Dryden; George Pearse Ennis, who worked in stained glass and watercolors; and muralist Ezra Winter.

The school enrolled more than 400 students its first year; this soon grew to 900, making it one of the largest art programs in New York City. In 1925 Edmund Greacen engaged Arshile Gorky as an instructor, one of the school's most prominent teachers; he remained with the school until 1931. It was in operation for almost 20 years, including a summer program in Maine, closing in 1944.

== Exhibitions and Events ==
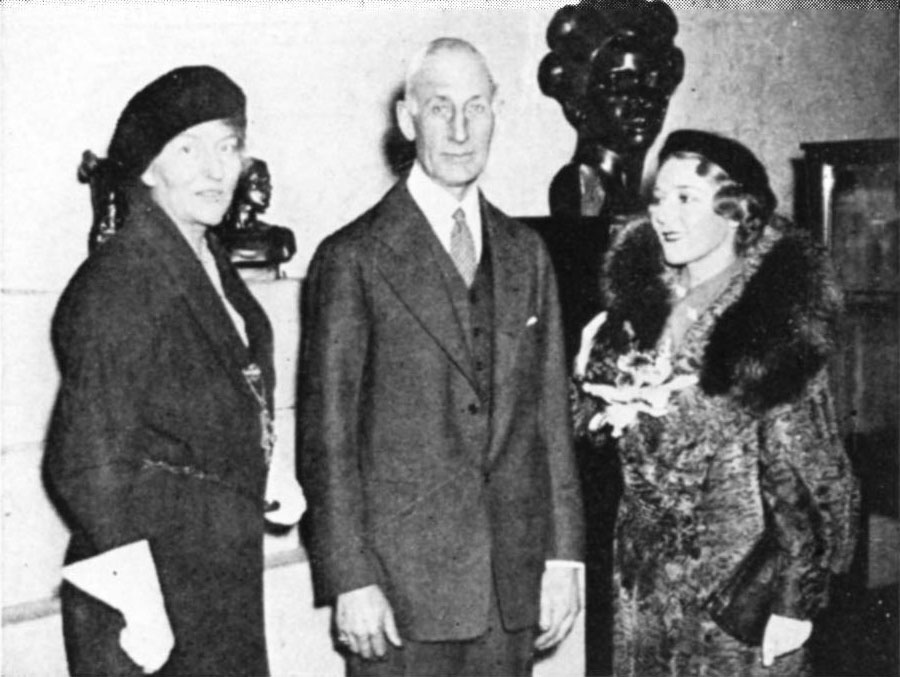
Artist Malvina Hoffman; Stanley Field, director and the nephew of the founder of the Field Museum of Natural History in Chicago; and actress Mary Pickford; at the 1934 opening of Hoffman's Grand Central Art Galleries exhibition "The Races of Man."

Throughout its history the Grand Central Art Galleries regularly held exhibitions large and small. Whether events were free or admission was charged, they helped to publicize the Galleries as well as advance the cause of the arts they championed.

- March 23, 1923: "Exhibition of Paintings and Sculptures Contributed by the Founders of the Galleries." The Grand Central Art Galleries' opening exhibition featured 170 works, including Sargent's The Artist Sketching, Daffodils by Charles W. Hawthorne, Leslie Buswell by Cecilia Beaux, and Mr. Alleyne Ireland by Ernest Ipsen. Sculpture included Spirit of Life by Daniel Chester French, Summer's Freeze by Herbert Adams, Diana by Robert Aitken, and Roosevelt by Frederic MacMonnies.
- February 23, 1924: "Retrospective Exhibition of the Important Works of John Singer Sargent. The exhibition featured 60 oil paintings, including Portrait of Mrs. H.F. Hadden (1878), The Lady with the Rose (1882), Portrait of Mrs. Fiske Warren and Daughter (1903), and Lake O'Hara (1916) as well as 12 watercolors. The catalog noted that exhibition was a benefit for the endowment fund of the Painters and Sculptors Gallery Association, "with which Mr. Sargent has from the beginning been in active cooperation."
- January 11, 1925: More than 4,000 people attended the Galleries' "Retrospective Edition of British Paintings," which was organized under the auspices of the English-Speaking Union. Paintings ranged from the middle of the 18th century to present day, including works by William Hogarth from the "Rake's Progress" series, portraits by Joshua Reynolds, a landscape by Thomas Gainsborough, and a large canvas by Alfred Munnings, H.R.H., the Prince of Wales. John Singer Sargent showed 10 paintings, including his portrait of Ena Wertheimer, A Vele Gonfie; Troops Going Into Line; Head of a Bedouin Arab; and a portrait of Lady Sassoon.
- 1926: "Modern Italian Art," an exhibition organized under the auspices of the Italian American Society with a wide range of recent works by Italian masters. Included Medardo Rosso's Ecce Puer, Adolfo Wildt's The Virgin, Giovanni Boldini's Portrait of Whistler, and Amedeo Modigliani's Madame Modigiliani.
- March 7, 1926: The Galleries were the site of the Carnegie International Exhibition, the first time it had ever been held outside Pittsburgh. The event featured works of artists from 12 countries. More than 500 paintings selected for the show by Homer Saint-Gaudens, son of Augustus Saint-Gaudens and subject of an 1890 portrait by Sargent. Separate rooms were dedicated to each country, and because of their number, the exhibition was divided into the exhibition into two parts. The first included America, Belgium, Germany, Holland, Italy, Poland, Russia, and Spain; the second showed works from Austria, Czechoslovakia, France, Great Britain, and Sweden.
- November 13, 1926:* A film-related "symposium and supper" was held at the Galleries. Organized together with the Film Bureau, "a volunteer organization for the promotion of the best pictures," the event took place in the Sargent Room. Examples of motion pictures from several countries, including Russia's Moscow Art Players, were shown. Tickets were $5 (the equivalent of $60 in 2008), and attendees were encouraged to bring their own amateur works.
- February 14, 1928: "Exhibition of Drawings by John Singer Sargent." Sargent died in 1925, and three years later the Grand Central Art Galleries organized a posthumous exhibition of previously unseen sketches and drawings from throughout his career. The materials were found in the artist's London studio after his death, and Sargent's sisters chose Walter Leighton Clark to go through them. Clark selected several hundred works for consideration. They included early drawings made by Sargent when he was a teenager and experiments with watercolors from 1872, as well as preparatory sketches for celebrated paintings such as Madame X, now in the Metropolitan Museum of Art, and Gassed, now in the National Gallery in London. Also shown were preparatory studies for the murals in both the Boston Public Library and the Museum of Fine Arts, Boston. The exhibition catalog lists approximately 75 works as having been shown.
- February 2, 1930: "Thirty-three Moderns," a show of contemporary work from 33 artists of the avant-garde Downtown Gallery. More than 130 works were shown, included Morris Kantor's Woman Reading in Bed, Walt Kuhn's Beryl, Samuel Halpert's Girl in a Bathing Suit, Marguerite Zorach's Sixth Avenue, and "two cute babies" by Yasuo Kuniyoshi. The New York Times critic Edward Alden Jewell started his review with unbridled enthusiasm:

What a week it has been at the Grand Central Galleries, with thirty-three "radicals" from the Downtown Gallery occupying "an entire city block," and Grand Central attachés going about, as it were, brightly on tiptoe, tacitly exclaiming, "We feel actually devilish to be doing a thing like this!" and Mr. Clark, the president, all smiles, observing quite openly: "Why it's a success, it's a success!" and Holger Cahill delivering an eleventh hour informal lecture to salespeople on "how to sell modern art," and nearly a dozen pictures sold on the opening day along, and important American collectors on hand who had probably never until that moment stepped foot in the premises, and for Monday's reception the gallery's best china brought out, and tea poured in such quantities as are seldom exigent, and heaped plates of the most special kinds of cake, and everybody trying, generally in vain, to catch sight of the art over a Caliban sea of shoulders.

"Things are at last beginning to be done in a really big way here," Jewell wrote later in the review of "33 Moderns," which was scheduled to run for three weeks at the Galleries.

- February 10, 1932: One-man show of paintings by Hovsep Pushman. Sixteen paintings were on display and all sold the opening day. The prices ranged from $3,500 up to $10,000 (the equivalent of more than $150,000 in 2009).
- February 21, 1932: Portraits by Walter Leighton Clark; paintings by Charles Chapman and George de Forest Brush.
- June 7, 1932: Memorial exhibition of sculpture by the late Daniel Chester French.
- January 31, 1934: "The Races of Man," a collection of 90 life-sized bronze sculptures by Malvina Hoffman. Among many others, the opening was attended by Hoffman, Field Museum of Natural History director Stanley Field, actress Mary Pickford, and philanthropist Helen Clay Frick. During the exhibition, a special reception was held for Indian dancer Uday Shankar and his troupe.
- October 30, 1957: An exhibit of works by Gordon Grant. The evening of the opening, Grand Central Terminal was struck by a blackout, the result of a transformer fire. As The New York Times wrote: "In the Grand Central Art Gallery, high in the terminal, 350 art lovers had gathered for the opening of an exhibit by Gordon Grant. Led by a single flashlight beam, they played follow-the-leader down dark stairways to the street."
- October 30, 1962: "The Edge of Dreams," an exhibition of 32 paintings by Ruth Ray, an American painter in the magic realism style.
- November 7, 1977: "Nick Eggenhoffer and Harold Von Schmidt: A Retrospective/Exhibition."
- August 24, 1981: "Anita Loos and Friends," an exhibition of portraits, photographs and memorabilia relating to the actress and writer. She was to have attended the opening, but died on August 18. On view were oils, pastels, watercolors, and charcoal and pen-and-ink sketches by artists such as Raymond R. Kinstler, Modigliani, and John Singer Sargent. This was the last show in the Galleries' Biltmore location.
- October 26, 1983: "La Femme: Influence of Whistler and Japanese Print Masters on American Art, 1880-1917" brought together paintings by American artists influenced by James McNeill Whistler or who were associated with the spirit of his work. Movements referenced in the show included Japonisme, Art Nouveau, Symbolism, Tonalism and the works of the Pre-Raphaelites. Artists represented included Edwin Austin Abbey, John White Alexander, Elliot Daingerfield, Arthur Bowen Davies, George Hitchcock, Will Hicok Low, and Whistler.
- April 22, 1986: "Realism From the People's Republic of China," featuring the work of artists then living in the United States. They included Jin Gao, a painter, and her husband, sculptor Wang Jida; and painters Li Quanwu, Chen Danqing, and Zhang Hongnian. Four years later, The New York Times wrote that Jin brought "the era of (forced) Communist propaganda art to a virtual end," and called her "one of [the Galleries'] most successful artists."
- December 13, 1988: "New York: Empire City in an Age of Urbanism, 1875-1945," an exhibition to benefit the Soviet-American Cultural Exchange Program. Tickets were $60 and included a buffet and entertainment.
- May 16, 1989: "The Food Show: Painting From Soup to Nuts," an exposition of contemporary paintings, many of which were created especially for the show.

The Galleries also organized traveling shows in "all major American cities" to promote and sell the work of its artist-members. While this practice declined in the late 1940s as the United States railroad system was progressively dismantled and shipping costs increased, it continued until at least the 1980s. During the steamship era the Galleries also placed works in transatlantic liners and ships passing through the Panama Canal. "As someone has remarked, these are exhibitions which people attend without meaning to," Clark wrote in 1934. Among other locations, a permanent display of work was maintained in the Boca Raton Hotel.

== United States Pavilion in Venice ==
Having worked tirelessly to promote American art at home the 1920s, in 1930 Walter Leighton Clark and the Grand Central Art Galleries spearheaded the creation of the U.S. Pavilion at the Venice Biennale. Up until then there was no place at the Biennale dedicated to American art, and Clark felt that it was crucial to establishing the credentials of the nation's artists abroad. The pavilion's architects were William Adams Delano, who also designed the Grand Central Art Galleries, and Chester Holmes Aldrich. The purchase of the land, design, and construction was paid for by the Galleries and personally supervised by Clark. As he wrote in the 1934 catalog:

"Pursuing our purpose of putting American art prominently before the world, the directors a few years ago appropriated the sum of $25,000 for the erection of an exhibition building in Venice on the grounds of the International Biennial. Messrs. Delano and Aldrich generously donated the plans for this building which is constructed of Istrian marble and pink brick and more than holds its own with the twenty-five other buildings in the Park owned by the various European governments."

The pavilion, owned and operated by the Galleries, opened on May 4, 1930. Approximately 90 paintings and 12 sculptures were selected by Clark to be shown for the opening exhibition. Artists featured included Max Boehm, Hector Caser, Lillian Westcott Hale, Edward Hopper, Abraham Poole, Julius Rolshoven, Joseph Pollett, Eugene Savage, Elmer Shofeld, Ofelia Keelan, and African-American artist Henry Tanner. U.S. Ambassador John W. Garrett opened the show together with the Duke of Bergamo.

The Grand Central Galleries did not participate in the Biennale in 1936 in a protest to the rise of fascism in Italy. In 1948, after the war's end, the Galleries' sent 79 paintings to Venice. It ran the pavilion until the 1950s, inviting organizations such as the Museum of Modern Art and Whitney Museum of American Art to present exhibitions.

The Galleries had built the pavilion with the hope that, like the other buildings at the Venice Biennale, it would eventually be run by nation whose art it showed. Support from the U.S. government was not forthcoming, however, and in 1954 the Galleries sold the pavilion to the Museum of Modern Art. Throughout the 1950s and 1960s shows were organized by the Modern, the Art Institute of Chicago, and the Baltimore Museum of Art. The Modern withdrew from the Biennale in 1964, and the United States Information Agency ran the Pavilion until 1983, when it was sold to the Guggenheim Museum courtesy of funds provided by the Peggy Guggenheim Collection. In 2009 the Guggenheim sold the Pavilion to the Philadelphia Museum of Art.

== Expansion ==
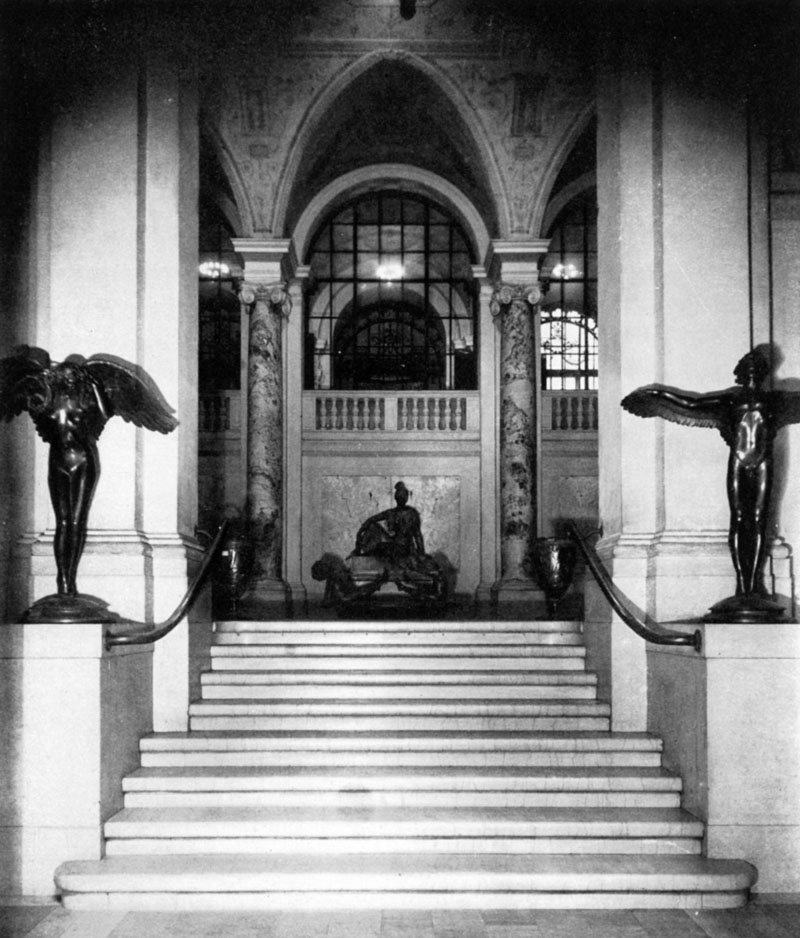
Entry to the Grand Central Art Galleries' midtown location at Fifth Avenue and 51st Street, circa 1934.

In 1933 the Grand Central Art Galleries opened a second location at Fifth Avenue and on 51st Street in the former building of the Union Club of the City of New York. The expansion was made possible by Jeremiah Milbank, owner of the property at the time. As Clark wrote:

"These beautiful new Galleries with their many windows on Fifth Avenue and on 51st Street, have presented during the past eight months an ever-changing panorama of American Art which has been viewed by over one hundred thousand people daily. Quite a number of paintings and bronzes have been purchased by new clients."

The former Union Club building was used for six years, until 1939, when Galleries' "uptown division" moved to the second floor of the Gotham Hotel on 5th Avenue. Eighty artists' works were shown at the new location's December 9 opening, including those by Eugene Higgins, Wayman Adams, John Johansen, Albert Sterner, Sidney Dickenson, Carl Rungius, Randall Davey, John Follinsbee, Robert Brackman, Robert Philipp, and Leopold Seyffert.

To show modern art, in 1947 the Grand Central Art Galleries established Grand Central Moderns. Founded by Erwin S. Barrie, it was directed from 1951 through 1965 by Colette Roberts. After the gallery "wandered about for several years" it settled at 130 East 56th Street in 1950. Artists represented by Grand Central Moderns included Byron Browne, Lamar Dodd, Jennett Lam, and Louise Nevelson. Grand Central Moderns closed in 1967.

== Transition ==
While they were founded during the 1920s boom, the Grand Central Art Galleries were structured so that they could withstand economic downturns. Three funding streams were envisioned: members fees, which in the early years provided the majority of income; sales commissions; and proceeds from ticket sales. Income remaining after expenses safeguarded in a conservatively managed "sinking fund" (reserve) that the founders established. This strategy served the gallery well, but five years into the Depression, the Galleries' management felt the need for extraordinary measures:

"Although the lay membership subscription fee has been $600 annually during the ten years of the existence of the Galleries, it was deemed necessary by the management to reduce this subscription to $350 for 1933 and 1934, and we urgently invite those interested in American art and American artists to become members for this year on this new basis."

Prosperity returned to the Galleries as the Depression's effects lessened: By 1936 their lay membership had returned to 115, more than twice as they'd had in any year since 1929. Time brought new challenges, however: Walter Leighton Clark had died in 1935, and Greacen followed in 1949. With the decline of railway traffic after World War II, the New York Central Railroad sought to maximize the value of the land on which Grand Central Terminal sat. In 1954 developer William Zeckendorf proposed replacing the terminal with an 80-story tower designed by I.M. Pei. While this plan came to nothing, in 1958 the company signed an agreement with developer Erwin S. Wolfson to demolish the colonnaded six-story building at the terminal's north end and build the 59-story Pan Am Building in its place. The decision pushed the Grand Central Art Galleries out of the terminal from which they had taken their name.

Erwin S. Barrie, who had served as director of the since the Galleries' 1922 founding, supervised their relocation in 1958 to the nearby Biltmore Hotel, at 40 Vanderbilt Avenue. The new location, on the hotel's second floor, offered six exhibition rooms, a reserve storage room, and an office. In 1977, after 19 years at the Biltmore, an auction was held of 500 lots of unclaimed artwork donated by members through the years. The works were given a two-day preview and then sold to benefit the artist-membership program. The Galleries remained at the Biltmore for 23 years, until the structure was gutted and converted into an office building. The final show was "Anita Loos and Friends." Describing the end of the Biltmore and the Grand Central Art Galleries' final show there, John Russell of The New York Times wrote:

"Hardly since Samson tore down the great temple at Gaza has a building disappeared as rapidly as the Biltmore Hotel. But people have shown a rare persistence this last day or two in pushing their way upstairs at the entrance on Vanderbilt Avenue to where the Grand Central Galleries has been holding its own."

Barrie retired in 1975, having led the Galleries for more than 50 years, and Gerry Thomas took over temporarily as manager. In 1976 James D. Cox became director, only the second in the Galleries' history. Cox led their second relocation, this time to 24 West 57th Street. There the Galleries had the entire second floor, 9,000 square feet (840 m^{2}), extending from 57th to 56th Streets. The entrance on 57th featured an escalator, while that on 56th was at street level. There Cox worked to adjust the Galleries' approach to fit the times, holding shows such as "La Femme: The Influence of Whistler and Japanese Print Masters on American Art, 1880-1917."

== The end ==
James D. Cox left the Grand Central Art Galleries in December 1989. After his departure they were managed by John Evans, a longtime salesman, until they closed in 1994.

The Galleries' archives as well as those of Edmund Greacen are at the Smithsonian Archives of American Art. The archives of the Grand Central Moderns are at Syracuse University and the Smithsonian. The archives of the firm of William Adams Delano and Chester Holmes Aldrich are held by the Drawings and Archives Department in the Avery Architectural and Fine Arts Library at Columbia University; the university's Avery Architectural and Fine Arts Library also has a significant collection of Chester Holmes Aldrich's correspondence.

During their operation the Grand Central Art Galleries were often incorrectly referred to by The New York Times and other publications as the "Grand Central Galleries," "Grand Central Gallery," and "Grand Central Art Gallery." Archive searches in the Times will reveal many news items, events, and exhibitions listed under those names. Please note that the "Grand Central Gallery" in Palm Beach, Florida, and the "Grand Central Art Center" in Fullerton, California, have no relationship to the Grand Central Art Galleries, past or present.

== See also ==
- Grand Central Terminal art, general works of art in the station
