= Gerard Curtis Delano =

American painter

- Born: April 14, 1890; Marion, Massachusetts
- Died: 1972
- Known for: Painting

Gerard Curtis Delano, often credited as Jerry Delano, (April 14, 1890 – 1972) was a painter and illustrator of the American west.

Delano was born in Marion, Massachusetts. He served in the US Navy in the First World War, then worked on a ranch in Colorado, before moving to New York City to study art. For many years he lived and painted in Denver, Colorado and Summit County, Colorado.

== Career ==
In his early artistic years, Delano:

- Illustrated magazines such as Cosmopolitan, Collier's Weekly and Western Stories
- Painted scenes for calendar companies
- Drew comic illustrations for magazines both in the US, such as Life and Puck, as well as Punch in Britain.

During his later years, his painting focused on depictions of Navajo people, red sandstone canyons, and wildlife. His style shows some Cubist influences.

== The saguaro cactus as a symbol of the West ==
In 1940, Delano painted Navajo Shepherdess, placed in Monument Valley. In it he placed a saguaro cactus, although it was well outside the naturally occurring area for this plant. It is believed to be the first illustrative use of the plant to symbolize the American West, which has become almost ubiquitous.

== Education ==
- Art Students League of New York
- Grand Central School of Art, New York
