= Saul Tepper =

American illustrator and songwriter

- Born: December 20, 1899; New York, New York
- Died: January 1987 (aged 87); New York, New York
- Known for: Illustration, Composer
- Awards: Society of Illustrators Hall of Fame, 1980

Saul Tepper (December 20, 1899 – January 1987) was an American illustrator and songwriter. Tepper studied under illustrator Harvey Dunn at the Grand Central School of Art in New York City.

Tepper began his career with Albert Dorne as a letterer for fashion catalogs but went on to do story illustrations for the most popular magazines of the day. Additionally, his illustrations appeared in advertising for major companies such as General Electric, Coca-Cola, General Motors, Mobil, and Texaco.

In the 1950s, Tepper created television commercials while an art director for J. Walter Thompson.

Later in life, he became a songwriter whose work was recorded by Nat King Cole, Ella Fitzgerald, Glenn Miller, and Harry James.

He was inducted into the Society of Illustrators Hall of Fame in 1980.

== See also ==
- Albert Dorne
- National Museum of American Illustration
- Grand Central School of Art
