= Edmund Greacen =

American painter

Edmund William Greacen
- Born: 1876; New York City
- Died: 1949 (aged 72–73); White Plains, New York
- Education: Art Students League of New York, New York School of Art
- Known for: Painting
- Movement: Impressionism
- Awards: Salmagundi Club Samuel T. Shaw Prize, 1922

Edmund William Greacen (1876–1949) was an American Impressionist painter. His active career extended from 1905 to 1935, during which he created many colorful works in oil on canvas and board. One of his works, a reproduction of which is at the Smithsonian Institution, was awarded the Salmagundi Club's Samuel T. Shaw Prize in 1922. In addition to his work as an artist, Greacen also founded, ran and taught in New York City's Grand Central School of Art for more than 20 years.

== Origins ==
Greacen was born in New York City, New York, the son of Thomas Edmund Greacen and Isabella Wiggins. Greacen's father had arrived from Scotland in 1868 and had established a shoe business. Thanks to the father's success in business affairs, the family was able to maintain a home at 6 West 50th Street—the site is now occupied by the Rockefeller Center — and in Delaware County in upstate New York, where the couple and their four children spent their summers.

Greacen earned a bachelor's degree from New York University and afterward was sent on a "shoe-selling world cruise" by his father, who wanted him distracted from a fascination with the Spanish–American War. After returning, Greacen decided to pursue the career of an artist and in 1899 enrolled at the Art Students League of New York, also taking classes at the New York School of Art, where he studied with William Merritt Chase. During his studies Greacen met Ethol Booth of New Haven, Connecticut, an art student enrolled in the nearby Miss Morgan's art school. They were married in 1904.

In 1905 Greacen and his wife traveled to Spain with the Chase class, and then the couple went on to study in the Netherlands, Belgium, and England. Ethol was the primary model for her husband's en plein air paintings made during this time. A son, Edmund William Jr, was born in Paris in 1906, and by the summer of 1907 the family had rented a house in Giverny, France, near the home of Claude Monet. Greacen only met the painter once, but was impressed with the artist as well as the paintings of water lilies he was creating. While at Giverny the couple's daughter, Nan, was born in 1908.

== New York ==
The family returned to the United States in 1910 and Greacen established studio in New York City that he would maintain until 1917. He began exhibiting his work at shows and galleries, joined the National Arts Club, and started the Manhattan School of Art. While continuing to work in Manhattan, he also became a member of the Old Lyme Art Colony of American Impressionists at Old Lyme, Connecticut. It was there that his free-brush style depicting landscapes and flower gardens continued to evolve. During World War I Greacen served for six months, but did so with the French YMCA because of his age.

After returning to New York, Greacen continued his art career. In 1920 he was elected into the National Academy of Design as an Associate member, and became a full Academician in 1935. In 1922 a one-man show at the Macbeth Gallery was followed by his receiving the Samuel T. Shaw Prize, worth $1,000, from the Salmagundi Club. The same year, Greacen joined with John Singer Sargent and Walter Leighton Clark to establish the Painters and Sculptors Gallery Association, an artists' cooperative. Out of this association grew the Grand Central Art Galleries and the Grand Central School of Art, of which Greacen became the director.

Greacen led the Grand Central School of Art for 20 years. Because his work kept him more and more in New York City, he ended his association with the Old Lyme artists' colony. He was elected an associate member of the National Academy of Design during this time, and in 1935 he was elevated to the status of Academician. Shortly after, however, a series of strokes impaired his health, and he and his wife moved to Florida. They eventually chose to return to New York after several years, and Greacen died at White Plains, New York at age 73.

== Archives ==
The papers of Edmund Greacen are at the Smithsonian Institution's Archives of American Art. Included are numerous writings, drawings, and photographs, as well as materials related to the National Academy of Design, the National Arts Club, the Manhattan School of Art, and the Grand Central School of Art.
