= Steven Carter (novelist) =

American writer

Steven Carter is an American author of short stories and two novels.

== Writing career ==
Carter's short stories have appeared in The Antioch Review, Tin House, Northwest Review, and Mississippi Review, among others. His first novel, I Was Howard Hughes, was published in 2003 by Bloomsbury Press. His second novel, Famous Writers School, based on the actual scam school for writers, was published by Counterpoint Press in 2006.

== Critical response ==
In its review on Famous Writers School, Publishers Weekly describes Carter as having "a terrific ear for the rumblings of the human ego and an intuitive sense of how fiction is often substituted for truth—and vice versa," though the characters are "lightly sketched".

== Personal life ==
Carter attended Hiwassee Junior College and Tusculum College. He is also a graduate of the Center for Writers at the University of Southern Mississippi. He currently teaches at Georgetown College.
