= Jennett Lam =

American painter

Jennett (sometimes Jennet) Brinsmade Lam (1911–1985) (Note: Some sources provide a date of death in 1983.) was an American painter.

Lam was born in Ansonia, Connecticut, and studied with Josef Albers at Yale University, receiving both her Bachelor of Fine Arts and her Master of Fine Arts degrees from that institution, in 1954 and 1960 respectively. She taught for many years at the University of Bridgeport, eventually being named professor emerita before retiring in 1972. During her career she received a fellowship to the MacDowell Colony in 1960 and 1961. She exhibited widely during her career in the United States and abroad. Lam's work may be found in the collections of the Museum of Modern Art, the Whitney Museum of American Art, and the Brooklyn Museum. A collection of her papers is held by the Archives of American Art at the Smithsonian Institution.
