= Walter Leighton Clark =

American painter

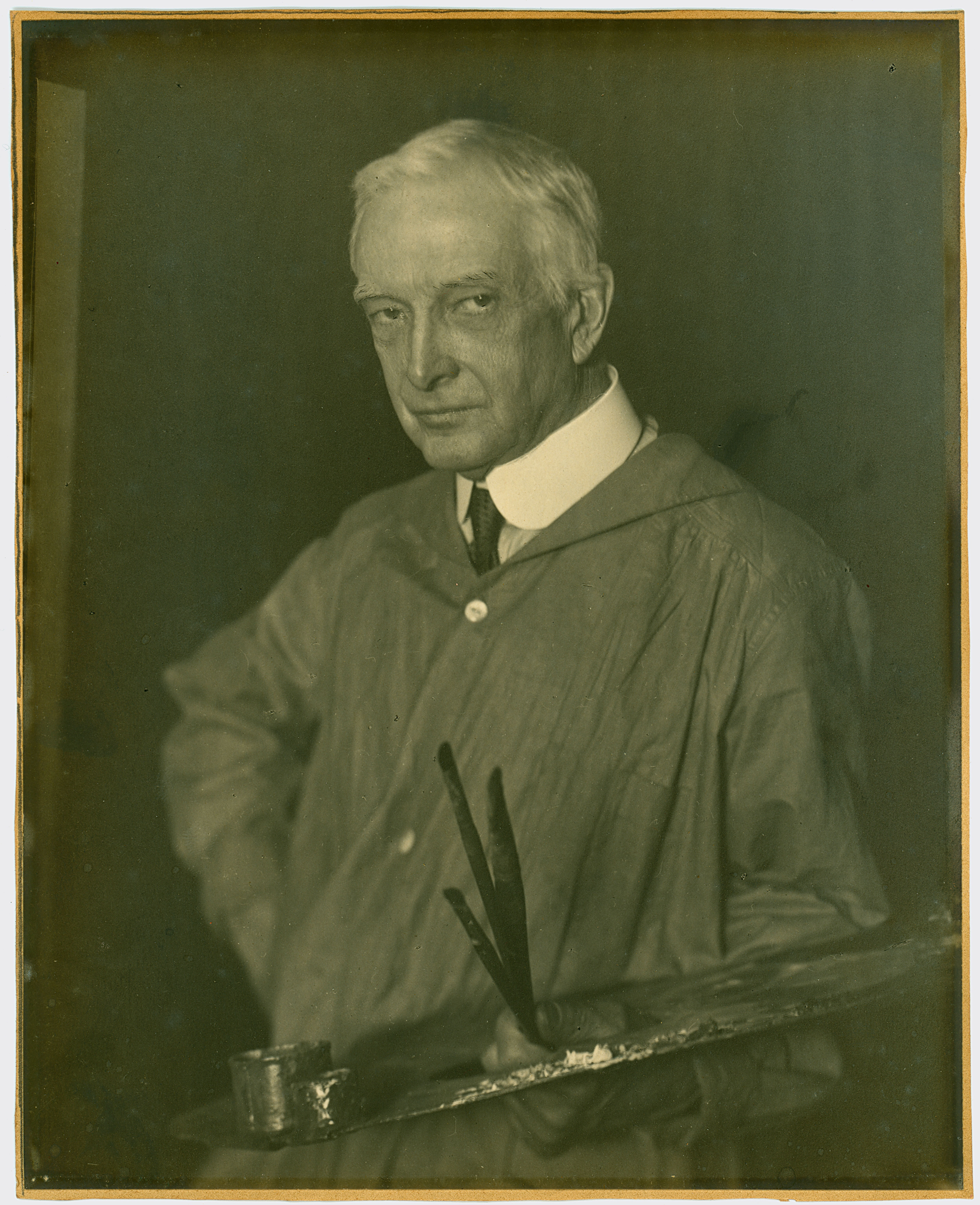
- Born: January 9, 1859; Philadelphia, Pennsylvania, United States
- Died: December 18, 1935 (aged 76); Stockbridge, Massachusetts, United States
- Occupations: Businessman, artist and inventor
- Children: Walter Leighton Clark, Jr., Bertha Vaughan Dunn (Clark)

Walter Leighton Clark (1859–1935) was an American businessman, inventor, artist, and philanthropist based in Stockbridge, Massachusetts and New York City.

== Biography ==
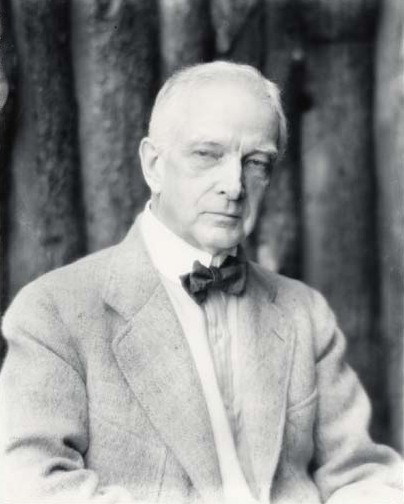
Portrait of W. L. Clark

Among other achievements, in 1923 Walter Leighton Clark founded with John Singer Sargent the Grand Central Art Galleries, located within New York City's Grand Central Terminal. Its mission was to offer notable American artists the opportunity to exhibit their work in the United States without having to send it abroad.

Together with sculptor Daniel Chester French and Dr. Austen Fox Riggs, Clark also played a central role in the founding of the Berkshire Theatre Festival in Stockbridge, Massachusetts. When the Stockbridge Casino, designed by Stanford White in 1887, fell into disuse, Clark, French, and Riggs purchased the building and had it moved to its current location. After renovations, the Berkshire Playhouse opened in 1928, and as the Berkshire Theatre Festival continues to be one of the region's centers of cultural life.

His autobiography, Leaves From an Artist's Memory, was published posthumously in 1937. Dictated to his sister Emma Killé Clark, Leaves is an account of Clark's boyhood adventures and subsequent rise from a machine-shop apprentice to industrialist and world traveler. In the book Clark detailed his friendships with Andrew Carnegie, John Singer Sargent, Thomas Edison, Charles Dana Gibson, Dame Ellen Terry, George Westinghouse, Julius Rosenwald, James A. Farrell, George Pullman, Thomas Hart Benton, and many others. During his time in Stockbridge he also studied sculpture with Daniel Chester French, and in 1916 acted as pallbearer for the funeral of Alexander Wilson Drake.

Clark died in Stockbridge, Massachusetts in 1935. He was staying at his sister's house, "The Roost," at the time, and was buried in Stockbridge Cemetery. His stone is engraved with the words of Edward Everett Hale: "Look up and not down; Look forward and not back; Look out and not in; And lend a hand."

== Clark's collection ==
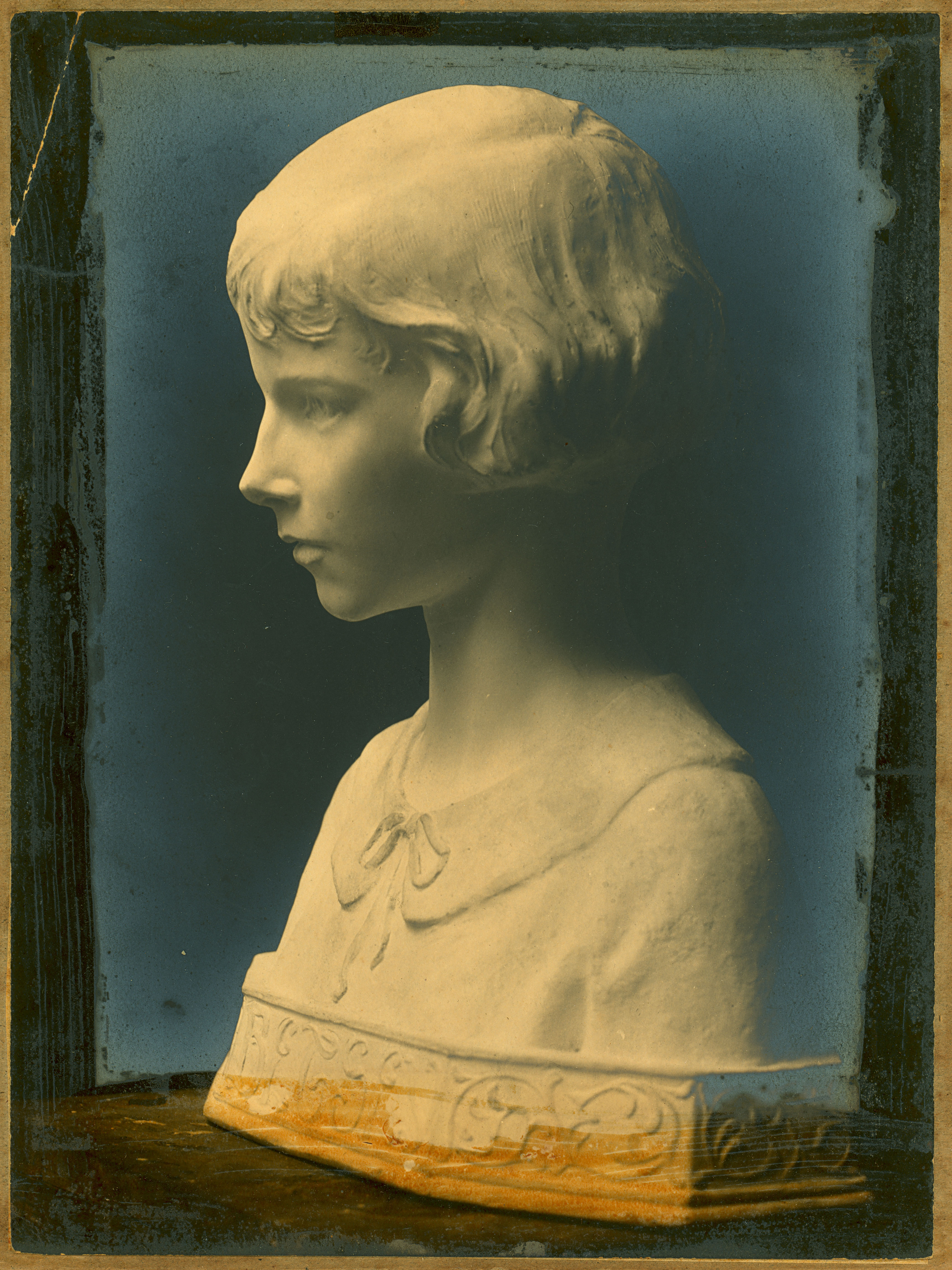
Bust of Betsey Dunn, Walter Leighton Clark, Studio of Daniel Chester French. Glass positive, whereabouts of bust unknown at present

=== Clark collection sold ===
A New York Times clipping from May 13, 1936 details the sale of the estate of Walter Leighton Clark. Items sold included two paintings: "Salome Receiving the Head of John the Baptist" by Bernardino Luini, sold for $1000, and Sir Anthony Van Dyck's "Portrait of Marten Rijckaert", sold for $720. The latter currently resides in the Prado Museum in Madrid, Spain. A clipping from The Berkshire Eagle lists other items sold as English and American period furniture, a number of important family pieces, copper and brassware, and 38 paintings.

An article from The Berkshire Eagle on May 12, 1936 estimated that Clark's estate was worth approximately $10,000. It was split between his two children, Bertha Vaughn Dunn and Walter Leighton Clark, Jr. On July 15, 1936, Clark, Jr and Dunn deeded 5 acres of land on the Stockbridge estate.

=== Recent sales ===
The most recent sale of his work was The Pooch sold by Christie's in New York in June 2007.
