= Carol H. Beck =

American painter

Carol Beck
- Born: 1859; Philadelphia, Pennsylvania, United States
- Died: October 14, 1908 (aged 48–49); Philadelphia, Pennsylvania, United States
- Education: Académie Julian; Pennsylvania Academy of the Fine Arts
- Known for: Painting; Criticism; Writing
- Awards: Mary Smith Prize; 1899

Carol H. Beck (1859-1908) was an American historical painter, critic and writer.

== Life and work ==
She was a student the Pennsylvania Academy of Fine Arts Schools from 1879 to 1884, where she studied under Thomas Eakins. She studied in Dresden, and at the Académie Julian in Paris. She returned to PAFA in 1899, where she did additional study under William Merritt Chase.

She received PAFA's 1899 Mary Smith Prize for best painting by a Philadelphia woman artist. She was a Fellow of the Academy and a member of the Plastic Club, Philadelphia. Beck painted portraits and her works were frequently exhibited. Well-known portraits include Governor Robert E. Pattison, painted for the Pennsylvania State Capitol, as well as a portrait of her brother Hon. James M. Beck. Her portraits were also seen in the University of Pennsylvania, in the Woman's Medical College of Pennsylvania, in Wesleyan College, at the capitols of Pennsylvania and New Jersey, and other public places, as well as in many private homes. Beck edited the Catalogue of the William P. Wilstach Collection of Paintings in Memorial Hall, Fairmount Park, Philadelphia. For some years and until her death, she was one of the managers of the Fellowships of the Pennsylvania Academy. On an order from Andrew Carnegie, she painted William Penn in armor for the Pennsylvania Society in New York, and several portraits for Skibo Castle.

== Beck Gold Medal ==
The now defunct Carol H. Beck Gold Medal was awarded for the best painting by an American artist exhibited at PAFA's annual exhibitions. Founded in 1908 by James M. Beck, in memory of his sister, it was first awarded in 1909. The portrait had to have been painted within the prior three years, and an artist could be awarded the medal only once. Recipients included John Singer Sargent, Robert Henri, George Bellows, John Sloan and Thomas Hart Benton.
