= Beck Gold Medal =

Carol H. Beck Gold Medal
- Description: Prestigious prize for the best oil portrait by an American artist
- Country: United States
- Presented by: Pennsylvania Academy of the Fine Arts (PAFA)
- Status: Defunct

Carol H. Beck Gold Medal (defunct) was a prestigious art prize awarded for the best oil portrait by an American artist submitted to the Pennsylvania Academy of the Fine Arts's annual exhibition. It was named for PAFA alumna and painter/writer/critic Carol H. Beck (1859–1908), whose brother James M. Beck founded the award in her memory. The portrait had to have been painted within the prior three years, and an artist could be awarded the medal only once.

Recipient history and status

The first Beck Gold Medal was awarded in 1909. Recipients included John Singer Sargent, Robert Henri, George Bellows, John Sloan and Thomas Hart Benton. The last was awarded in 1968. Beginning in 1969, the annual exhibitions were dedicated exclusively to student work from PAFA's school.

== Recipients ==
Year	Artist	Image	Work	Collection	Notes
1909	John Singer Sargent		Miss Mathilde Townsend	National Gallery of Art, Washington, D.C.	First Beck Gold Medal awarded
1910	Adolphe Borie		Lady with Black Scarf		
1911	Edmund Tarbell		Timothy Dwight, D.D., LL.D.	Yale University Art Gallery	
1912	Joseph de Camp		Francis I. Amory, Esq.		
1913	J. Alden Weir		The Black Hat	Brooklyn Museum	
1914	Robert Henri		Herself	Art Institute of Chicago	
1915	Charles Hopkinson		H. H. (The Artist's Daughter Harriot)	Rhode Island School of Design Museum	Exterior, snow scene. Half-length. Harriot Hopkinson, about age 11
1916	Douglas Volk		Dr. Felix Adler	Metropolitan Museum of Art	
1917	Joseph Thurman Pearson Jr.		The Twins: Virginia and Jane	James A. Michener Art Museum, Doylestown, Pennsylvania	The artist's daughters
1918	Leopold Seyffert		Fritz Kreisler	National Portrait Gallery, Washington, D.C.	
1919	Leslie P. Thompson		Portrait of a Girl		
1920	Eugene Speicher		Portrait of a Russian Woman		
1921	George Bellows		Eleanor, Jean and Anna	Albright-Knox Art Gallery, Buffalo, New York	The artist's aunt, daughter and mother
1922	Ellen Emmet Rand		The Honorable Donald T. Warner	Private collection	First woman to be awarded a Beck Gold Medal
1923	Lilian Westcott Hale		Miss Margaret Williams		
1924	Sidney E. Dickinson		Edward Dickinson	Allen Memorial Art Museum, Oberlin College, Oberlin, Ohio	
1925	William James		Alice Howe Gibbens James	Private collection	
1926	Alice Kent Stoddard		Miss S.		
1927	William C. Johansen		Elihu Root		
1928	William Paxton		Mrs. Francis R. Strawbridge		
1929	Richard Lahey		Madame Du Tarte		
1930	Leon Kroll		Joie		The artist's adopted daughter.
1931	John Sloan		Varèse, the Sculptor	National Portrait Gallery, Washington, D.C.	
1932	Saul		Child with Instrument		
1933	William Glackens		Girl in Black and White	Whitney Museum of American Art	
1934	Raphael Soyer		Gittel		
1935	John W. Beauchamp		Duck Hunter		At 29, the youngest artist to be awarded a Beck Gold Medal
1936	Jean MacLane		Rev. G. A. Studdert-Kennedy		
1937	Frank von der Lancken		My Mother		
1938	Arnold Blanch		Portrait of a Man		
1939	Leon Karp		My Wife		
1940	George Grosz		Self-Portrait	Edwin A. Ulrich Museum of Art, Wichita State University, Wichita, Kansas	
1941	Franklin C. Watkins		Misses Maude and Maxine Meyer de Schauensee		
1942	No medal awarded				
1943	Thomas Hart Benton		Aaron	Pennsylvania Academy of the Fine Arts	
1944	Louis Bouche		Les Fleurs sauvages (Wildflowers)		Barefoot man with bouquet
1945	Sigmund Menkes		Tola		
1946	Benton Murdoch Spruance		Mabel's Daughter		
1947	Sueo Serisawa		Pierrot		
1948	Alexander Brook		Young Pianist		
1949	Philip Evergood		Her World	Metropolitan Museum of Art	
1950	Henry Mattson		Self-Portrait		
1951	Henry Varnum Poor		The Artist in Summer (Self-Portrait)		
1952	Gladys Rockmore Davis		Study of an Old Woman (Rosa Jacobs)		
1953	Elsie Manville		The Yellow Hat		
1954	John King		Kathryn		
1955	Student exhibition				
1956	No medal awarded				
1957	Student exhibition				
1958	Robert Brackman		Peter Freuchen	The Explorers Club, New York City	
1959	Student exhibition				
1960	No medal awarded				
1961	Student exhibition				
1962	Balcomb Greene		Man in the City	ex coll. Vassar College	
1963	Student exhibition				
1964	Paul Georges		Wife and Children		
1965	Student exhibition				
1966	Ben Benn		Portrait of Velida (The Artist's Wife)		Auctioned at Shannon's, Milford, Connecticut, October 23, 2003; sold for $1,500.
1967	Student exhibition				
1968	Richard Diebenkorn		Large Woman		Last Beck Gold Medal awarded

== See also ==
- Temple Gold Medal
- Mary Smith Prize
- Widener Gold Medal
