= Douglas Volk =

American painter (1856–1935)

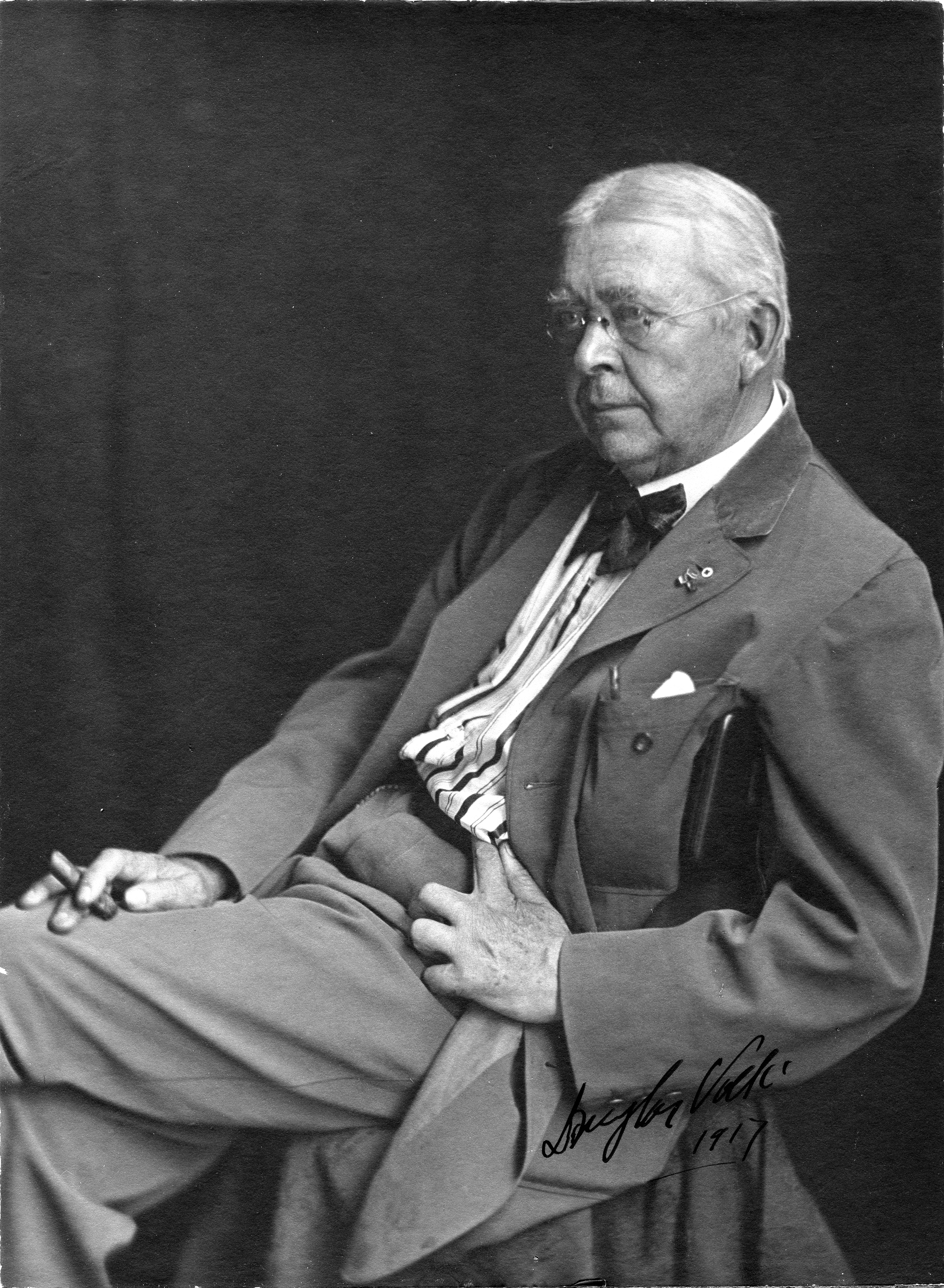
- Volk in 1917
- Born: Stephen Arnold Douglas Volk; February 23, 1856; Pittsfield, Massachusetts
- Died: February 7, 1935 (aged 78); Fryeburg, Maine
- Education: École des Beaux-Arts
- Occupations: Painter, muralist, educator
- Spouse: Marion Larrabee (m. 1881; died 1925)
- Children: 4
- Parent(s): Emily Clarissa King (Barlow) Volk; Leonard Wells Volk
- Awards: Beck Gold Medal

Stephen Arnold Douglas Volk (February 23, 1856 – February 7, 1935) was an American portrait and figure painter, muralist, and educator. He taught at the Cooper Union, the Art Students League of New York, and was one of the founders of the Minneapolis School of Fine Arts. He and his wife Marion established a summer artist colony in western Maine.

== Early life and education ==
He was born in Pittsfield, Massachusetts, to Emily Clarissa King (Barlow) Volk and the sculptor Leonard Wells Volk. He was named for his mother's maternal cousin, Stephen A. Douglas, the Democratic Party presidential nominee in 1860, who lost to Republican presidential nominee Abraham Lincoln. Congressman Lincoln posed for a bust by Leonard Volk in early 1860, and the sculptor made plaster casts of his face and hands. Four-year-old Douglas entertained the future president.

Volk spent his childhood in Chicago, but his family moved to Europe when he was fourteen. He began studying art in Rome, and attended the École des Beaux-Arts in Paris (1873 to 1879), where he was a pupil of Jean-Léon Gérôme. At age nineteen, he exhibited at the Paris Salon of 1875.

== Career ==
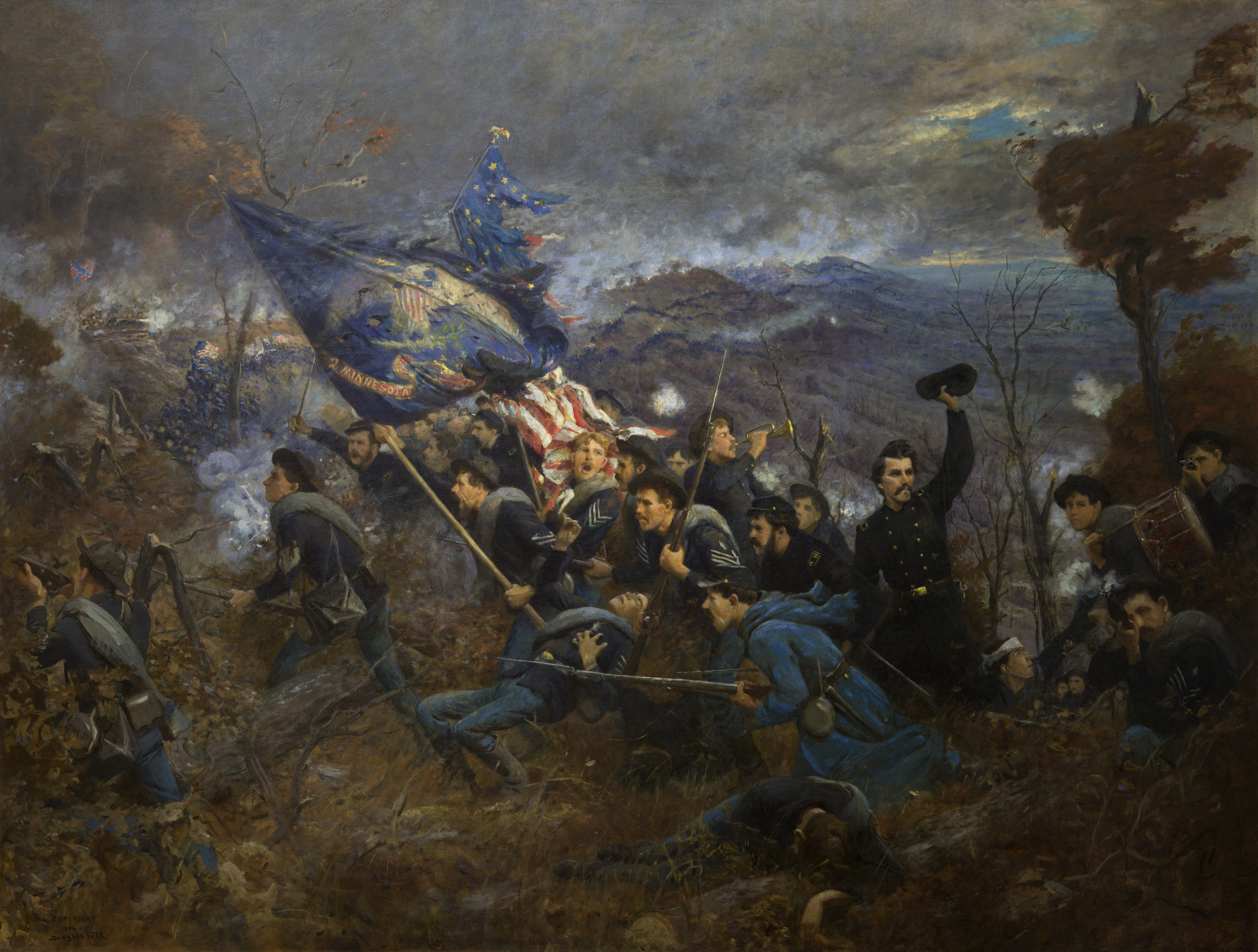
The Second Minnesota Regiment at Missionary Ridge, c. 1906, Governor's Reception Room at the Minnesota State Capitol

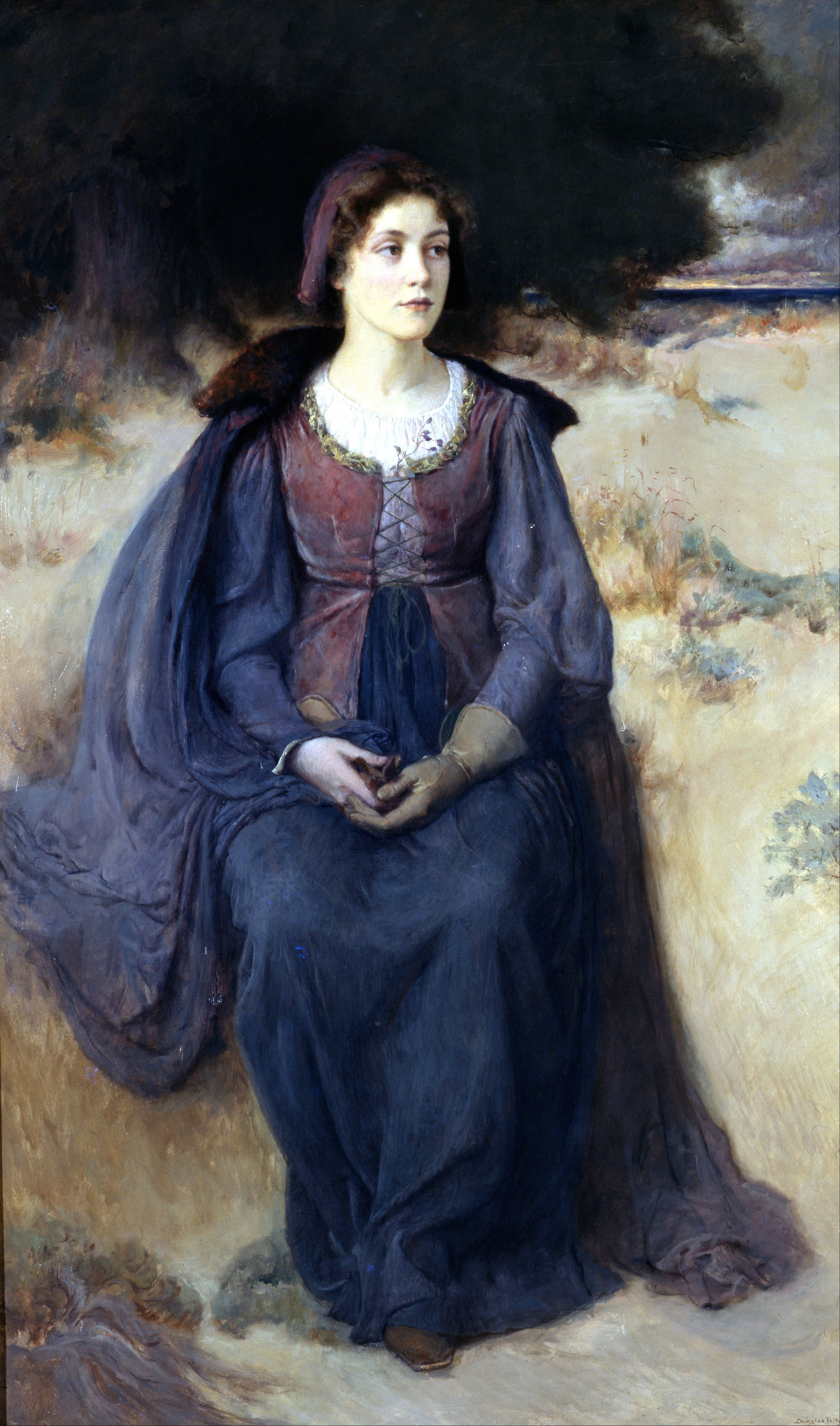
Ye Maiden's Reverie (1898), Berkshire Museum

He returned to the United States, and was hired as an instructor at the Cooper Union in New York City, where he taught from 1879 to 1884 and from 1906 to 1912. He helped to found the Minneapolis School of Fine Arts in 1886, and served as its director until 1893. He taught at the Art Students League of New York (1893 to 1898), the National Academy of Design (1910 to 1917), and intermittently at the Society for Ethical Culture.

He was also a working artist, noted for his figure and portrait paintings. He exhibited three works at the 1893 World's Columbian Exposition in Chicago, where the group won a medal, his first major award. One of the three, a "story picture" titled The Puritan Maiden, featured a young woman huddled against a tree in a bleak winter landscape. The footprints in the snow of her (unseen) lover lead away into the distance – "The snows must melt, the trees bud and roses bloom, ere he will come again." It had been painted twelve years earlier, but became enormously popular at the Exposition and later through engraved copies.

Family members posed as models for a number of his most famous paintings. Puritan Mother and Child (1897), featured his wife in historical costume embracing their youngest son, and was part of the group that won a gold medal at the 1915 Panama-Pacific Exposition in San Francisco. It is now in the collection of the Carnegie Museum of Art in Pittsburgh. The Young Pioneer (1899), a full-length portrait of his son Gerome in rustic costume holding a canoe paddle, won first prize at the 1899 Colonial Exhibition in Boston. It was bought for the Metropolitan Museum of Art in 1906, but later deaccessioned. The Boy with the Arrow (1903), which featured his son seated on a rock with Kezar Lake in the distance, won the 1903 Carnegie Prize from the Society of American Artists, a silver medal at the 1904 Louisiana Purchase Exposition in St. Louis, and the 1907 gold medal at the Carolina Art Association. It is now in the collection of the Smithsonian American Art Museum.

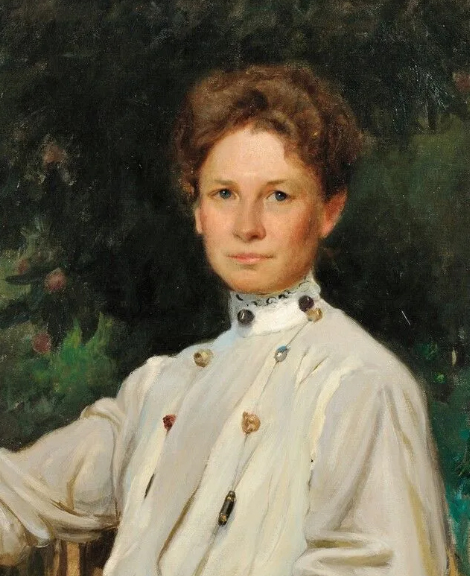
Portrait of Nelly Littlehale Murphy (1905)

Critic Charles H. Caffin found Volk's historicist work formulaic but sincere:

Generally, he paints a bit of the pine forest, rude and solemn, and places in it a girl or boy; with such differences of motive as are suggested by the titles "Song of the Pines," "Thoughts of Youth," "The Woodland Maid." The figures are types of healthful beauty, with earnest faces and large eyes peering into the beyond. The spirit of the nation's past and of its best hopes for the future seem to be figured in these types. The sober dignity of the color schemes, warm browns, rich woodland greens and glimpses of brilliant blue, enforce the serene impressiveness of these pictures. One realizes that they are the outcome of a sincere and purposeful mind.

He was one of eight American artists commissioned by the National Art Committee to depict major figures from the Great War (World War I). His three portraits – King Albert I of Belgium (1919), standing in uniform on a battlefield; British Prime Minister David Lloyd George (1919–20), seated at his desk; General John J. Pershing (1920–21), standing in uniform with his horse's reins in his hand – were donated to the National Portrait Gallery. The first two were later transferred to the Smithsonian American Art Museum. An abandoned version of Volk's Pershing portrait showed the general standing beside the grave of an unknown soldier.

== Personal life ==
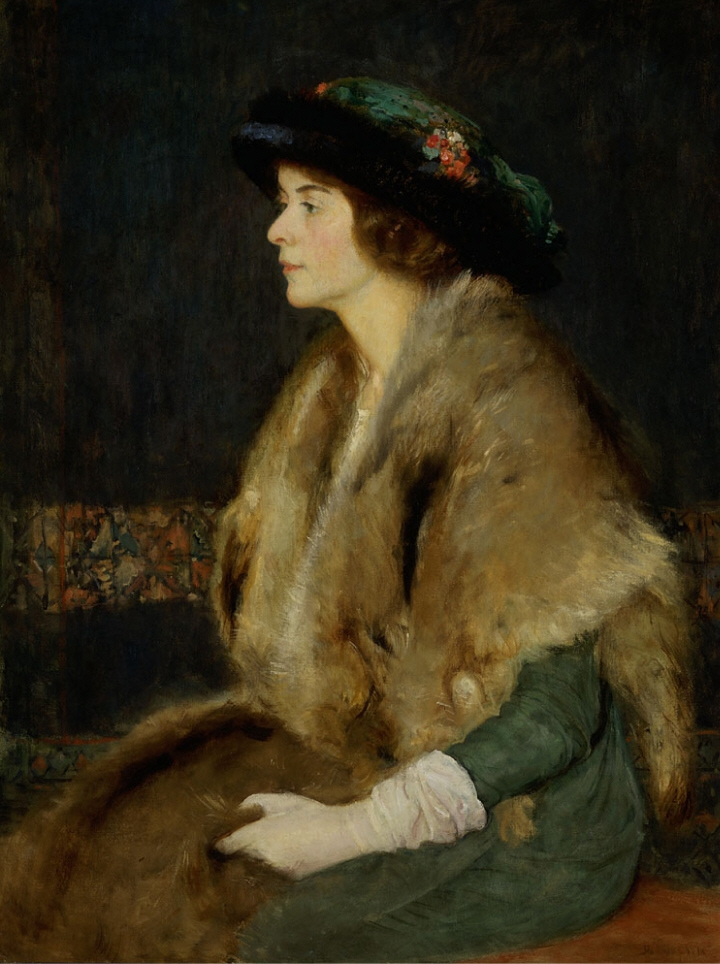
Marion, Portrait of the Artist's Daughter (1914), University of Rochester

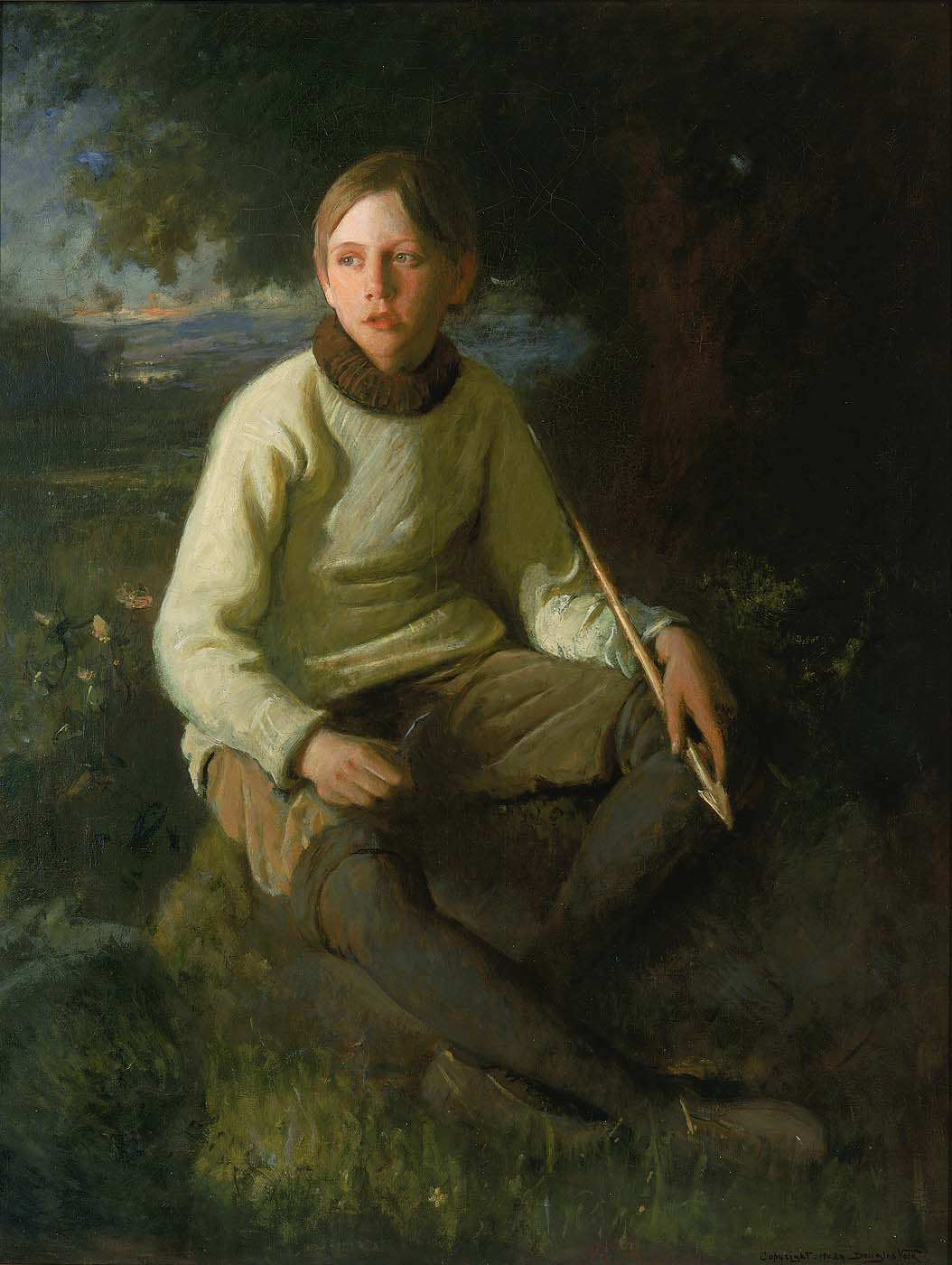
The Boy with the Arrow (Portrait of the Artist's Son) (1903), Smithsonian American Art Museum

In 1881 Volk married artist Marion Larrabee (1859–1925). She became the first instructor at the Minneapolis School of Fine Arts. Together, they had four children:

- Leonard Volk (1882–1891), who died young.
- Wendell Volk (1884–1953), a printmaker and woodcarver who married Jessie J. McCoig (d. 2004), also an artist, c. 1931.
- Marion Volk (1888–1973), who married Ezra R. Bridge in 1913.
- Gérôme Volk (1890–1959), who married Alice I. Masterton in 1939.

Volk retired to Maine following his wife's 1925 death. He died at Fryeburg, Maine on February 7, 1935.

=== Hewnoaks and Sabatos ===
The Volks began spending their summers in Center Lovell, Maine in the 1890s, and in 1904 bought a farmhouse on 25 acres along the shore of Kezar Lake. They renovated the house and added to it, naming it "Hewnoaks," and eventually building four additional cottages and an artist's studio for Volk. Numerous artists and craftspeople came to study with them over the years. Many of their friends in the Arts and Crafts Movement were houseguests, including artists J. Alden Weir, Frank Benson, Childe Hassam, and William Merritt Chase; architect John Calvin Stevens, interior designer John Scott Bradstreet, and Swedish-born woodcarver Karl A. von Rydingsvärd. Von Rydingsärd carved frames for a number of Volk's paintings, and taught woodcarving to Wendell Volk.

By the turn of the century, Marion Larrabee Volk had begun using traditional area looms to weave textiles and rugs. Rather than cotton, she became known for handwoven woolen work. Her designs were based on motifs from Native American art, and she made her own dyes out of natural materials – apple, yellow oak and maple tree bark; goldenrod, barberry, St. John's wort and madder root. In a communal effort with her children and local residents, she produced "Sabatos" rugs and textiles, named for a nearby mountain. Wendell Volk created silkscreen prints for the wool designs, and printed a treatise on the Sabatos work on his hand presses. Sabatos textiles are visible in the background of Douglas Volk's 1914 portrait of his daughter Marion.

The Volk family held the large property for 100 years. Jessie McCoig Volk, Wendell's widow, was the last to live there. Following her death in 2004, the property was bequeathed to the University of Maine, and a portion of the family records went to the Smithsonian Institution. University officials arranged for an auction of much of the property's contents and family papers, including art and craftwork by the Volks, and art they had collected. In October 2006, the contents grossed more than $700,000 at auction, drawing especially high prices for two paintings by the illustrator Howard Pyle and photographs of Native Americans by the Norwegian Frederick Monsen (1865–1929). One item sold at the 2006 auction was Marion Larrabee Volk's first Sabatos rug. It is now in the collection of the Metropolitan Museum of Art.

== Legacy ==
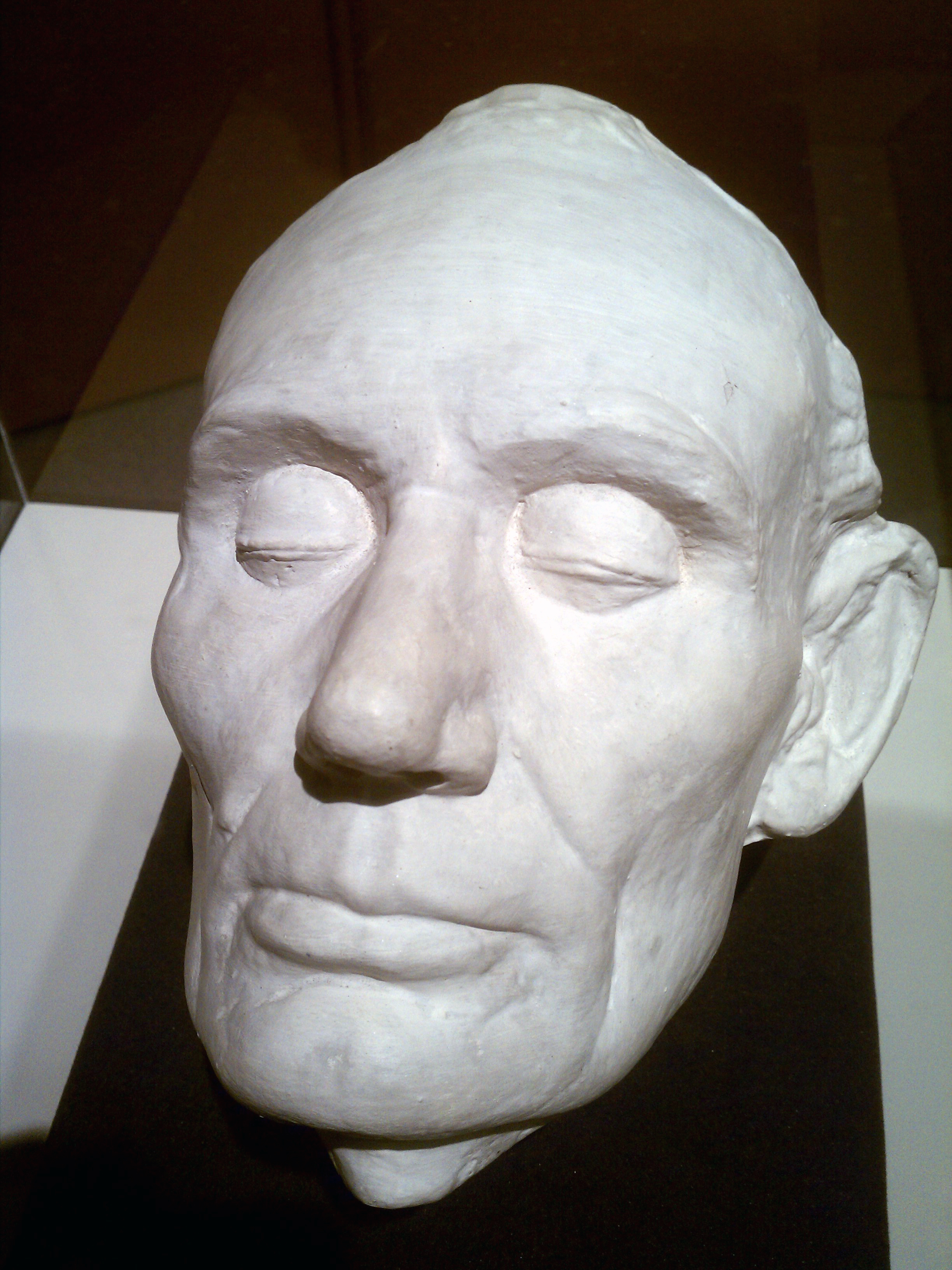
Life-mask of Abraham Lincoln (1860), cast by Leonard Volk

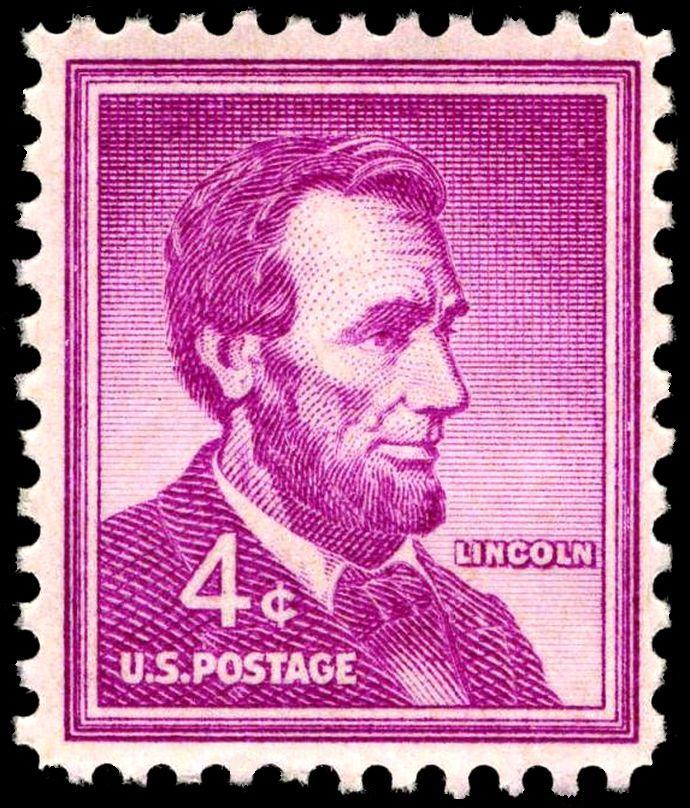
1954 U.S. postage stamp, based on a portrait by Douglas Volk

His students included artists Russell Cowles, Benjamin Osro Eggleston, Susan Ricker Knox, Ada Murphy, Ella Bennett Sherman, Adele Rogers Shrenk, and Helen Maria Turner.

He painted at least nine posthumous portraits of Lincoln, basing them on the plaster life-mask that his father had made in 1860. One of them hangs in the Lincoln Bedroom at The White House. Another appeared on a U.S. postage stamp issued in the 1950s, and is now at the National Gallery of Art.

His intimate portraits of friends and acquaintances were among his most effective works. These included educator Felix Adler (1914, Metropolitan Museum of Art), art dealer William Macbeth (1917, Brooklyn Museum), and New York governor Alfred E. Smith (1921, New York State Capitol). He was an advocate for teaching drawing and art to children, and published a monograph, Art Instruction in the Public Schools (1894).

In addition to the museums listed below, Volk's work can be found in the collections of the Albright–Knox Art Gallery, the Montclair Art Museum, the Muskegon Museum of Art, the Portland Museum of Art, and elsewhere. The Hermitage Museum and Gardens in Norfolk, Virginia owns several of his paintings, and its Tudor Revival building features extensive carving by his friend von Rydingsvärd.

"Hewnoaks," Volk's property in Maine, has been preserved and operates as a summer artist colony.

=== Honors ===
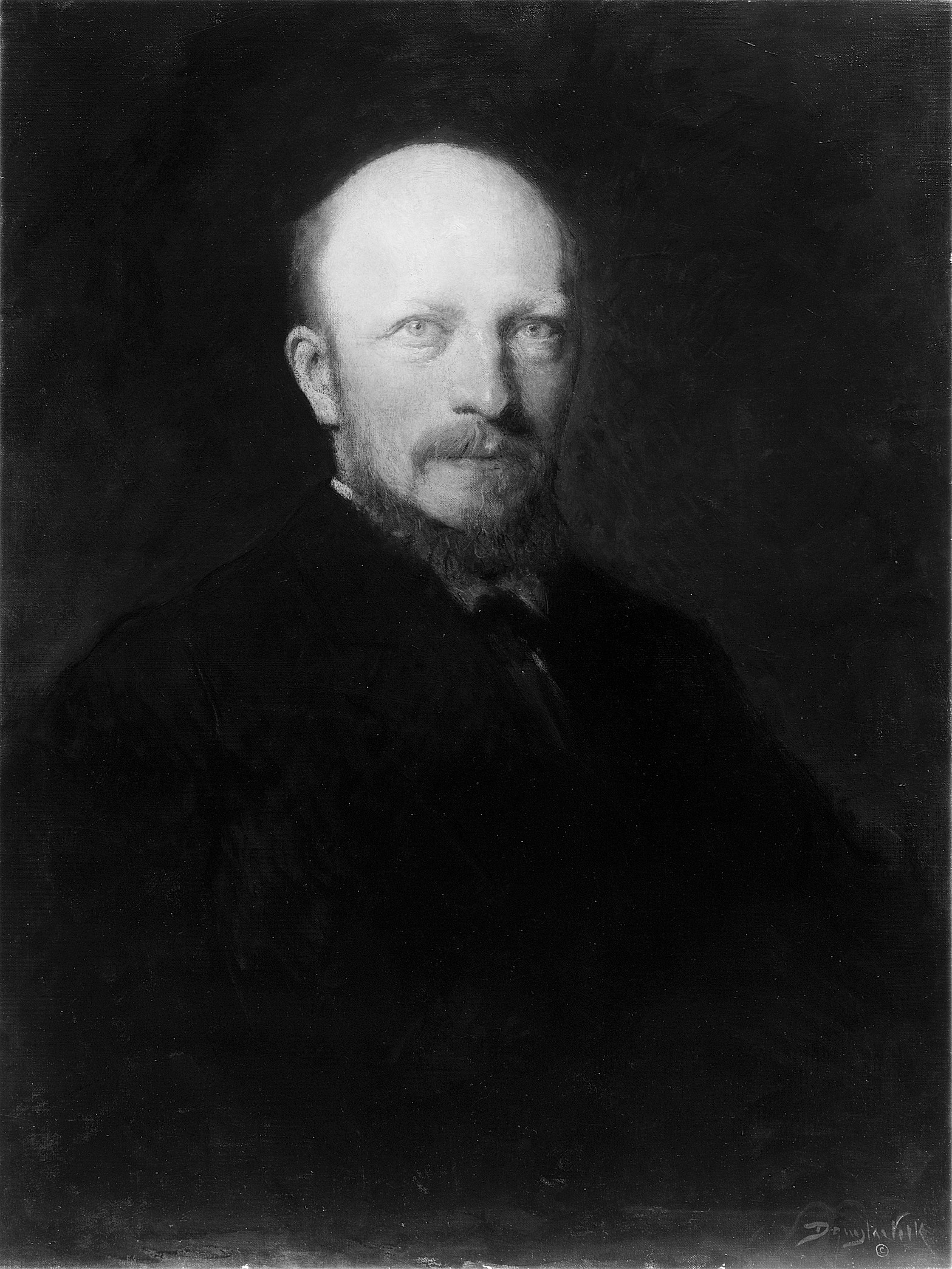
Dr. Felix Adler (1914), Metropolitan Museum of Art

Volk was elected to the Society of American Artists in 1880. He was elected an associate of the National Academy of Design in 1898, and became a full academician in 1899. The two organizations merged in 1906, and he served on the academy's council from 1916 to 1919, and as its recording secretary from 1920 to 1926. He was a member of the Architectural League of New York, the National Society of Portrait Painters, and the Society of Mural Painters.

- 1875 – Exhibited at Paris Salon – In Brittany.
- 1876 – Exhibited at Centennial Exposition, Philadelphia – In Brittany, Vanity.
- 1878 – Exhibited at Paris Salon – Portrait of Miss T.
- 1889 – Exhibited at Exposition Universelle, Paris – The Puritan Captives, After the Reception.
- 1893 – Medal, World's Columbian Exposition, Chicago – Group: Mending the Canoe, The Puritan Maiden, Portrait of Mrs. Lowry.
- 1899 – Shaw Prize, Society of American Artists, New York City – The Woodland Maid.
- 1899 – 1st prize, Colonial Exhibition, Boston – A Colonial Youth (The Young Pioneer).
- 1901 – Silver medal, Pan-American Exposition, Buffalo – Group: The Woodland Maid, Song of the Pines, The Maiden's Reverie, Thoughts of Youth.
- 1903 – Carnegie Prize, Society of American Artists, New York City – The Boy with the Arrow.
- 1904 – Silver medal, Louisiana Purchase Exposition, St. Louis – The Leetle Canadienne (The Boy with the Arrow).
- 1907 – Gold medal, Carolina Art Association, Charleston – The Boy with the Arrow.
- 1910 – Proctor Portrait Prize, National Academy of Design, New York City – Marion of Hewnoaks.
- 1910 – Saltus Gold Medal, National Academy of Design, New York City – The Little Sister (Little Marion).
- 1915 – Isaac N. Maynard Prize, National Academy of Design, New York City – Dr. Felix Adler.
- 1915 – Gold medal, Panama-Pacific Exposition, San Francisco – Group: Marion of Hewnoaks, Maid of the Manor, Mother and Child.
- 1915 – Gold medal, National Arts Club, New York City – Among the Lilies.
- 1916 – Beck Gold Medal, Pennsylvania Academy of the Fine Arts, Philadelphia – Dr. Felix Adler.
- 1921 – Cross of the Order of Leopold II. Presented by King Albert I of Belgium.

== Selected works ==
=== Paintings ===
- In Brittany (1875). Exhibited at the 1875 Paris Salon, and the 1876 Centennial Exposition in Philadelphia.
- Domestic Life in Normandy (1878)
- In the Studio: Portrait of Miss H. (1880), Joslyn Art Museum, Omaha, Nebraska.
- The Puritan Maiden (1881). Part of the group that won a medal at the 1893 World's Columbian Exposition in Chicago.
- Accused of Witchcraft (1884). Deaccessioned from Corcoran Museum of Art, c. 1951.
- After the Reception (1887), Minneapolis Institute of Arts. Exhibited at the 1889 Exposition Universelle in Paris.
- Portrait of John Scott Bradstreet (c. 1890), Minneapolis Institute of Arts.
- Little Marion (The Little Sister) (c. 1895), National Academy Museum, New York City. Winner of the 1910 Saltus Gold Medal from the National Academy of Design.
- Puritan Mother and Child (1897), Carnegie Museum of Art, Pittsburgh, Pennsylvania. Part of the group that won a gold medal at the 1915 Panama-Pacific Exposition in San Francisco (as Mother and Child).
- Ye Maiden's Reverie (1898), Berkshire Museum, Pittsfield, Massachusetts. Part of the group than won a silver medal at the 1901 Pan-American Exposition in Buffalo.
- The Young Pioneer (A Colonial Youth) (1899). Winner of the gold medal at the 1899 Colonial Exhibition in Boston. Ex-collection: Metropolitan Museum of Art, George A. Heard Fund purchase, 1906.
- A Woodland Maid (1899), High Museum of Art, Atlanta, Georgia. Winner of the 1899 Shaw Prize from the Society of American Artists, and part of the group that won a silver medal at the 1901 Pan-American Exposition in Buffalo.
- The Boy with the Arrow (Portrait of the Artist's Son) (1903), Smithsonian American Art Museum. Winner of the 1903 Carnegie Prize from the Society of American Artists, a silver medal at the 1904 Louisiana Purchase Exposition (as The Leetle Canadienne), and the 1907 gold medal at the Carolina Art Association.
- Colonial Belle (A Belle of the Colonies) (1904).
- Ave Maria, Mary, Blessed Virgin (1907), Berkshire Museum, Pittsfield, Massachusetts. Its carved frame is attributed to Karl A. von Rydingsvärd.
- Abraham Lincoln (1908, reworked 1917), National Gallery of Art, Washington, D.C.
- Marion, Portrait of the Artist's Daughter (Mrs. Ezra R. Bridge) (1914), Memorial Art Museum, University of Rochester.
- Portrait of Dr. Felix Adler (1914), Metropolitan Museum of Art, New York City. Winner of the 1915 Maynard Prize from the National Academy of Design, and the 1916 Beck Gold Medal from the Pennsylvania Academy of the Fine Arts.
- Portrait of William Macbeth (1917), Brooklyn Museum.
- Portrait of Governor Alfred E. Smith (1921), New York State Capitol, Albany.
- Portrait of John Cotton Dana (1923), Newark Museum, Newark, New Jersey.
- Self-Portrait (1923), National Academy of Design, New York City.
- Portrait of Frank L. Babbott (1925), Brooklyn Museum.
- Portrait of Major-General John G. Foster (1930), United States Military Academy Museum, West Point, New York.
- Portrait of Major-General Gordon Granger (1931), United States Military Academy Museum, West Point, New York.
- Lincoln, the Ever-Sympathetic (1931), Lincoln Bedroom, The White House.

==== Great War portraits ====
- Portrait of King Albert I of Belgium (1919), Smithsonian American Art Museum, Washington, D.C.
- Portrait of Prime Minister David Lloyd George of Great Britain (1919–1920), Smithsonian American Art Museum, Washington, D.C.
- Portrait of General John J. Pershing (1920–21), National Portrait Gallery, Washington, D.C.

=== Murals ===
- Father Hennepin Discovering the Falls of St. Anthony (1905), Minnesota Historical Society, St. Paul.
- Second Minnesota Regiment at the Battle of Mission Ridge (1906), Minnesota State Capitol, St. Paul.
- The Fur-Trading Period of Des Moines (1913), Polk County Courthouse, Des Moines, Iowa.

== Gallery ==
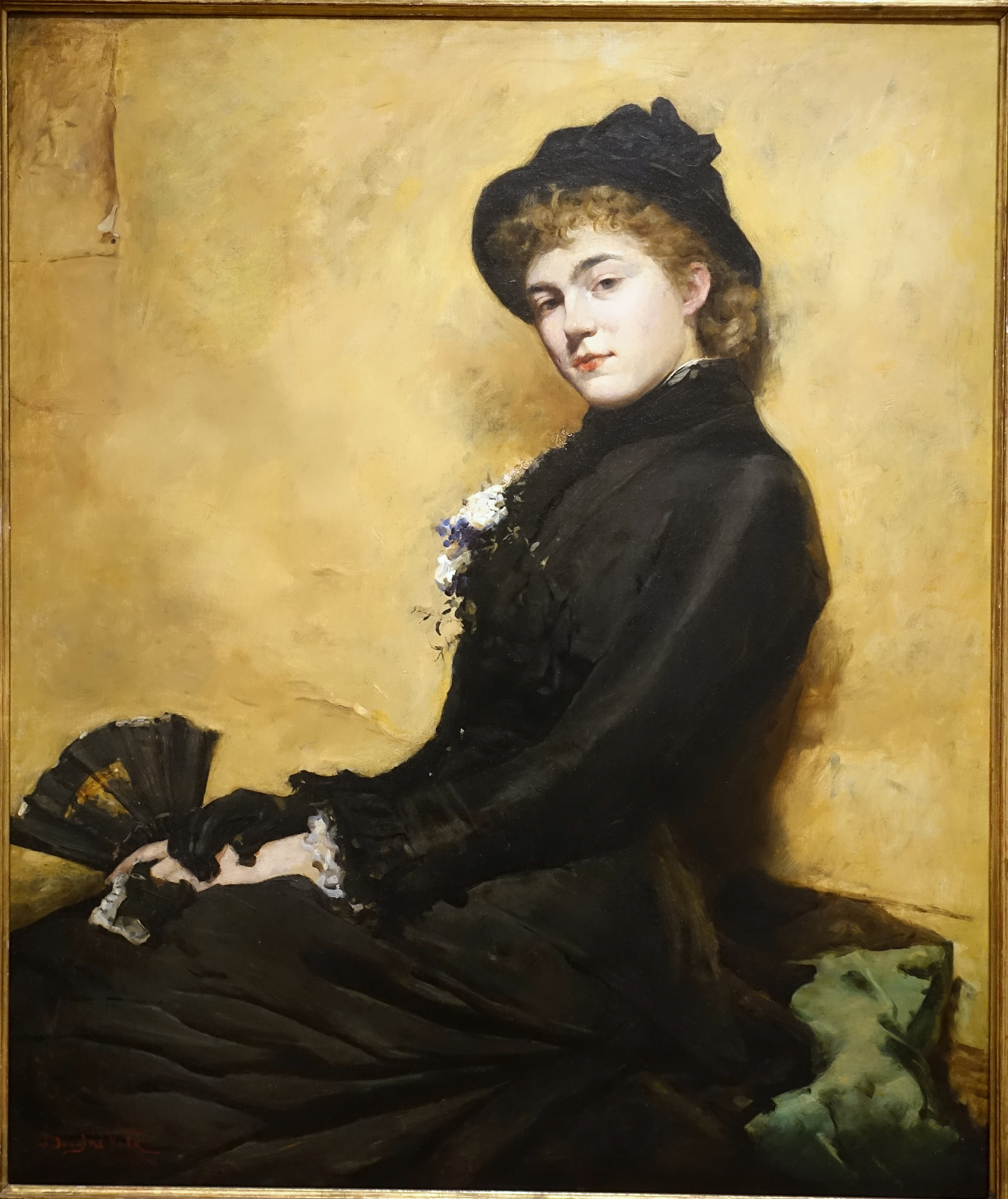
Miss H. (1880), Peabody Essex Museum

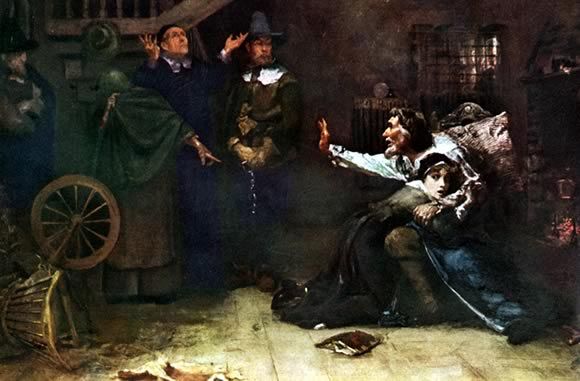
Accused of Witchcraft (1884). Deaccessioned from Corcoran Museum of Art.

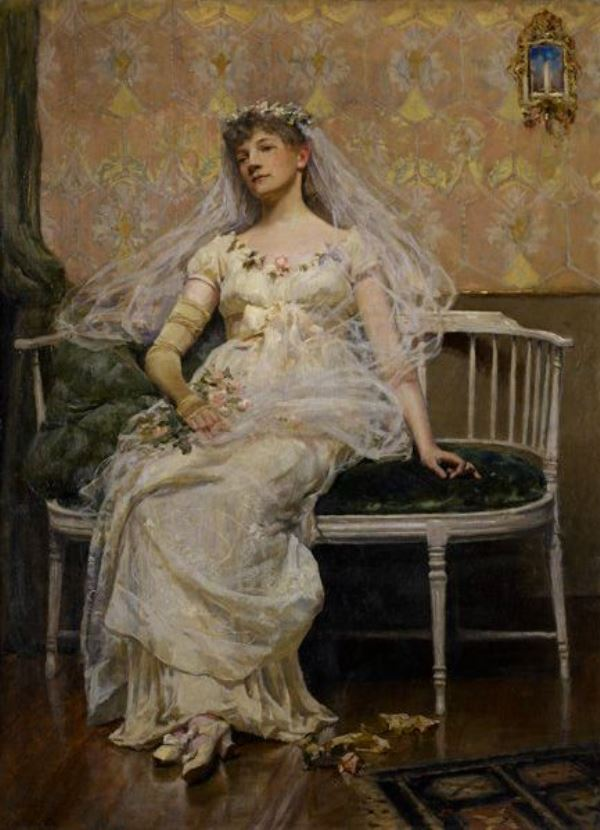
After the Reception (1887), Minneapolis Institute of Arts

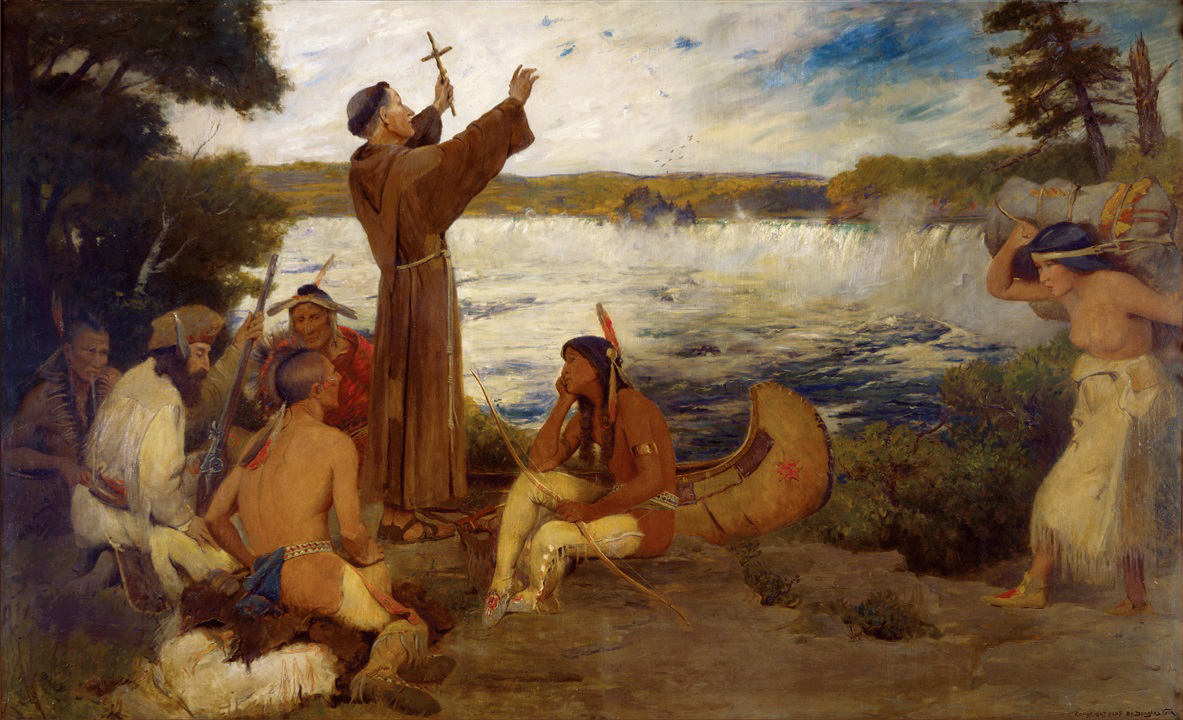
Father Hennepin Discovering the Falls of St. Anthony (1905), Minnesota Historical Society

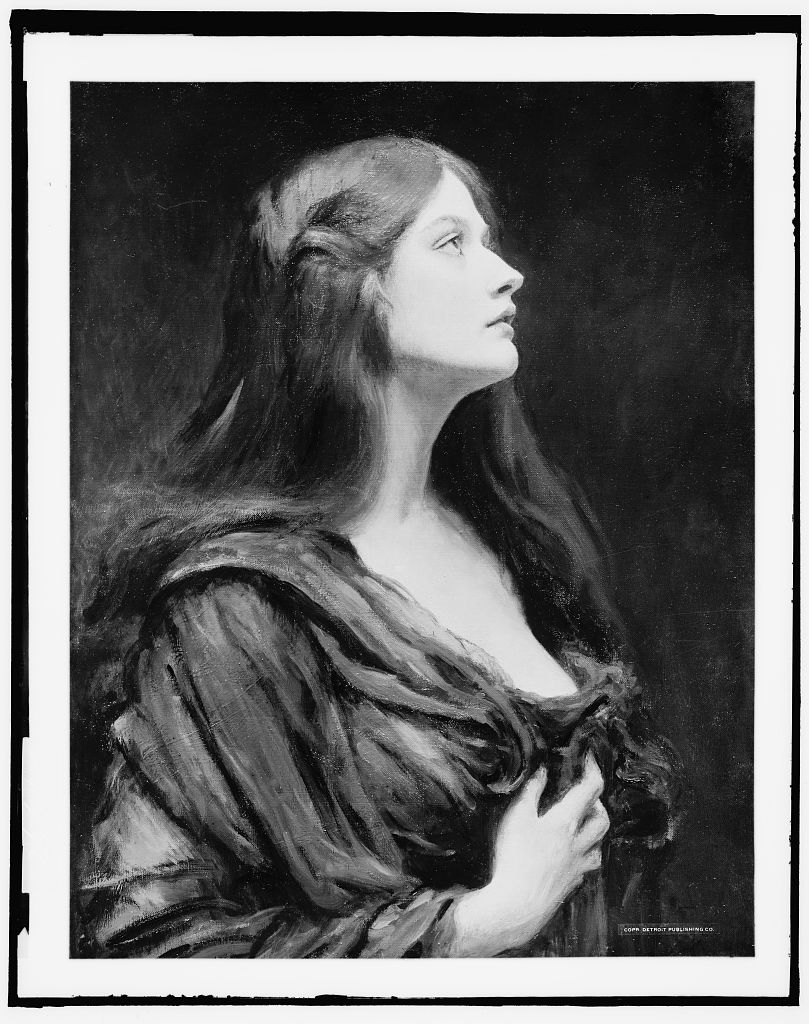
Ave Maria (1907), Berkshire Museum

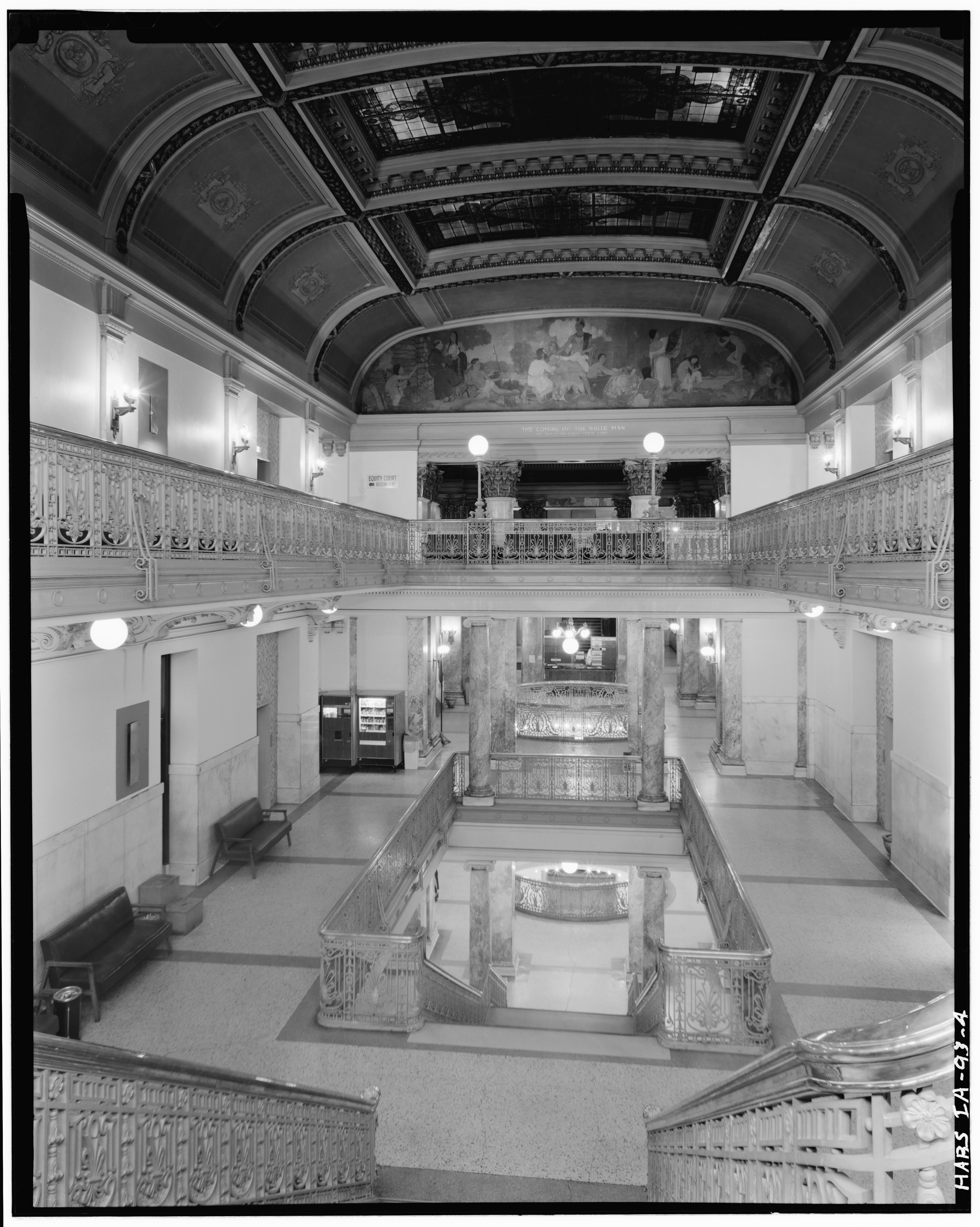
The Fur Trading Period of Des Moines, (1912), Polk County Courthouse, Des Moines, Iowa

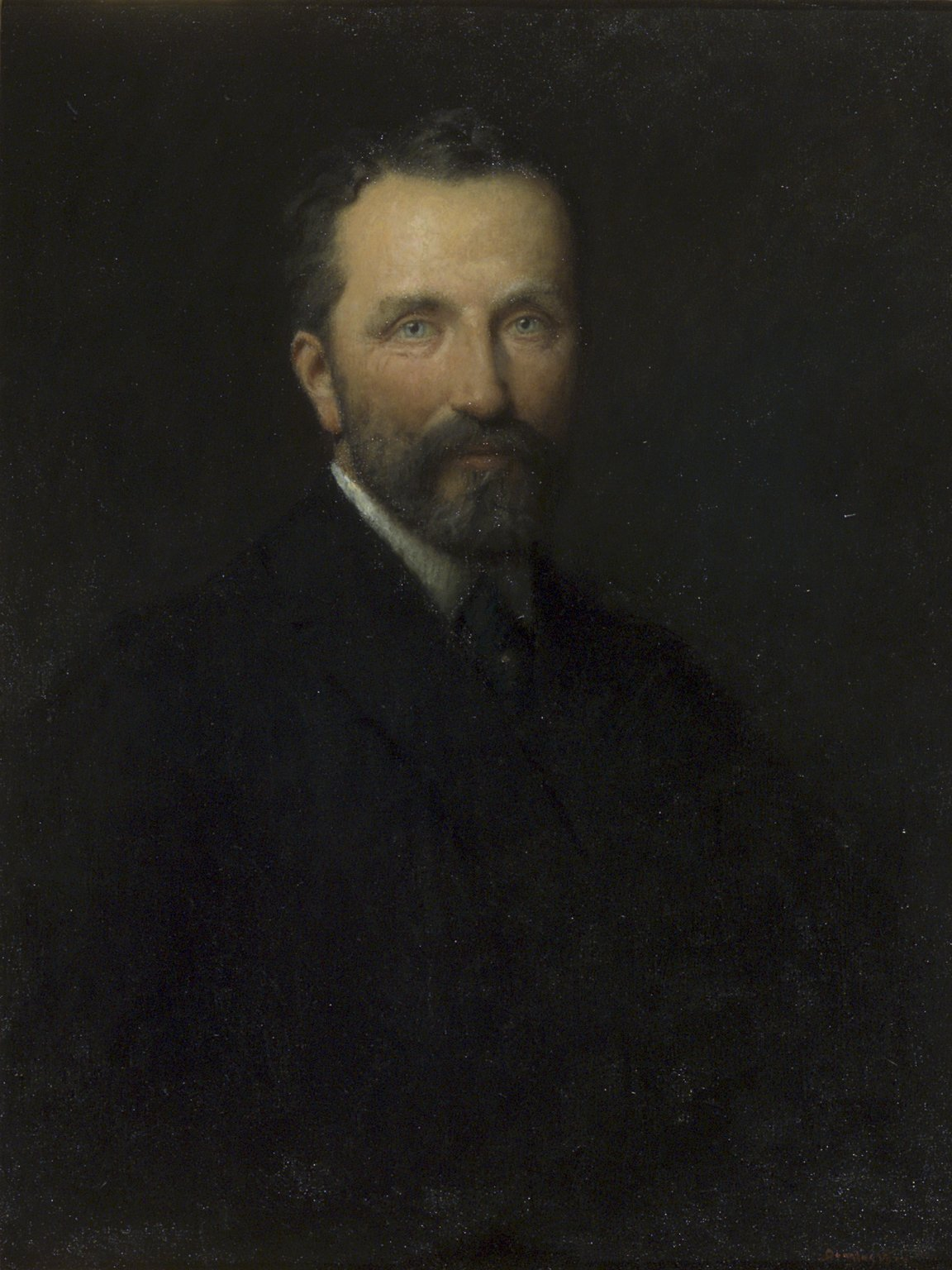
William Macbeth (1917), Brooklyn Museum

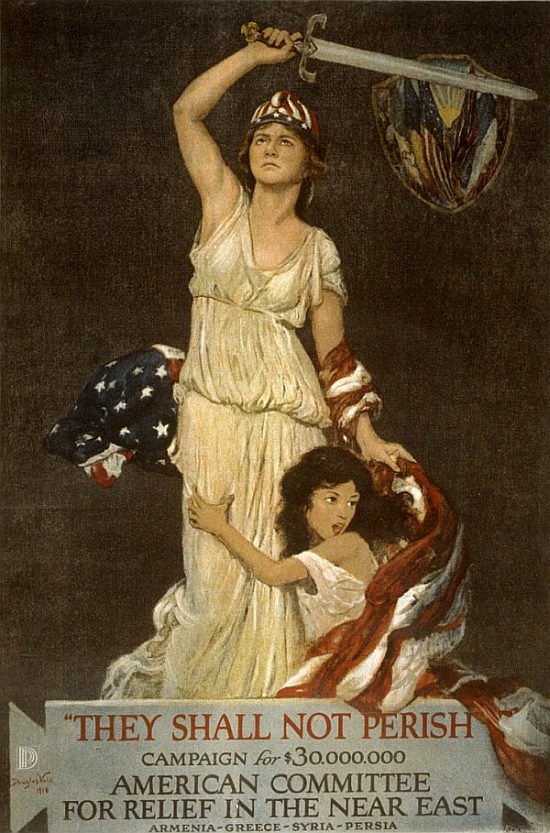
They Shall Not Perish (1918), World War I poster.

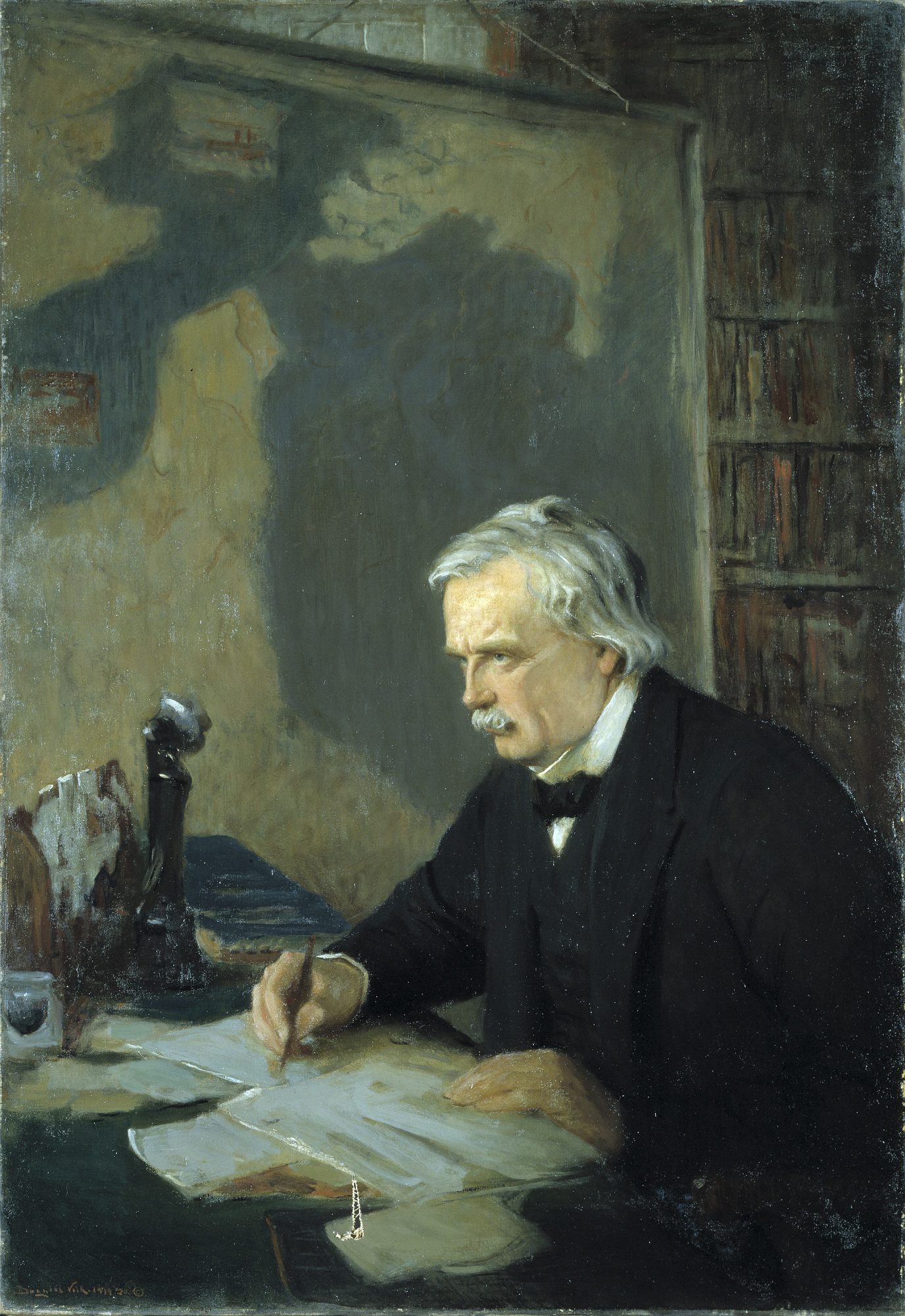
Prime Minister David Lloyd George (1919–20), Smithsonian American Art Museum

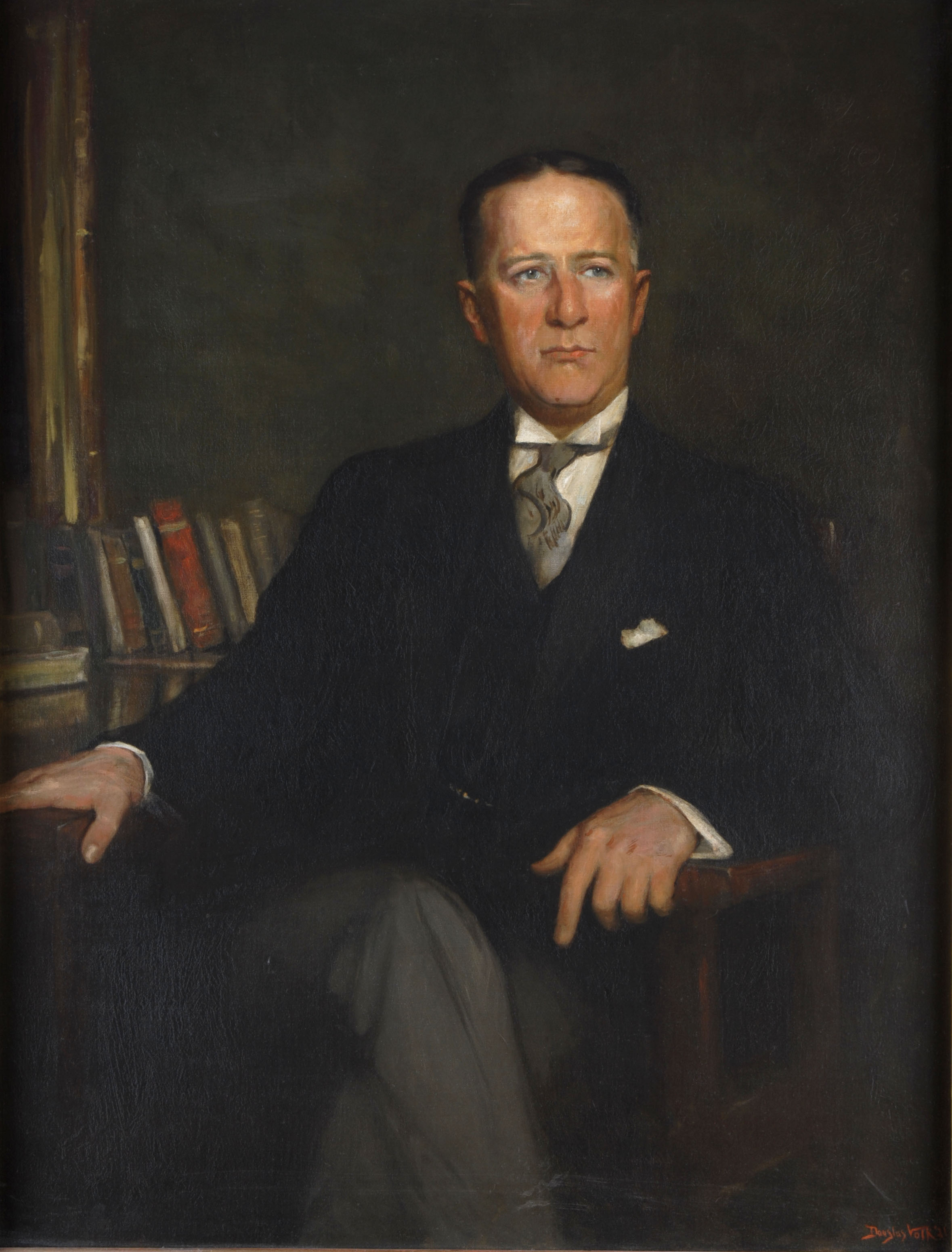
Governor Alfred E. Smith (1921), New York State Capitol
