= Anna H. Wilstach =

American art collector (1814–1892)

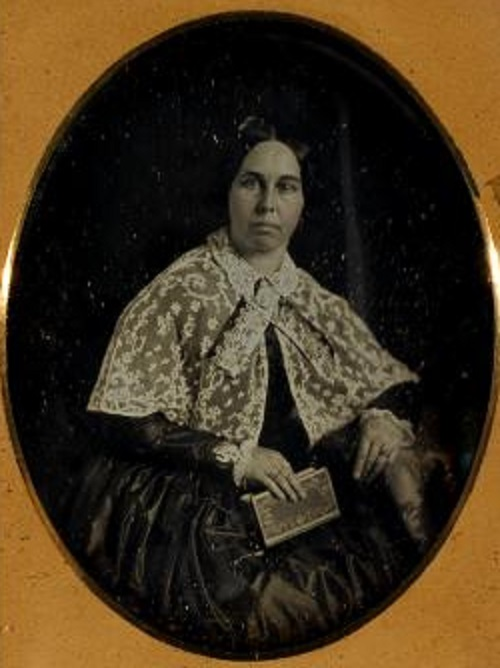
- Daguerreotype of Anna H. Wilstach, circa 1846
- Born: June 3, 1814
- Died: February 26, 1892 (aged 77); Philadelphia

Anna H. Wilstach (June 3, 1814 – February 26, 1892) was an American art collector and museum benefactor from Philadelphia.

== Biography ==
She married local businessman William P. Wilstach (c. 1816–1870) who owned a saddle fitting business and who won contracts for sabres and brass fittings from the Northern army during the American Civil War. After the war the couple seems to have travelled in Europe where they purchased artworks together, but presumably after William's death in 1870, Anna continued to purchase works on her own. The couple had two daughters but one had predeceased her husband and in 1873 Anna Gertrude died, leaving Anna in sole custody of the family fortune. Anna first founded the Trinity Memorial Church in Philadelphia to commemorate her daughter's early death, and proceeded to fund various schools and women's charities on a regular basis after that. She is known for the large number of codicils to her will, which enabled the founding of the current location of the Philadelphia Museum of Art, but which did not prevent the city of Philadelphia from overruling her wishes and selling most of her collection of paintings in 1954, keeping a few works by local painters and her sculptures, among them a series of animal bronzes by Antoine-Louis Barye and a bust of Washington by Hiram Powers.

In 1876, Philadelphia marked the 100th anniversary of American independence with the International Exhibition of Arts, Manufacturers, and Products of the Soil and Mine, commonly referred to as the Centennial Exposition. The first international fair to be held in the United States, the Exhibition celebrated the country's thriving arts, industry, and commerce. It was staged on more than 285 acres in Fairmount Park with a central art gallery, which became known as Memorial Hall (Philadelphia). Elizabeth Duane Gillespie, the great-granddaughter of Benjamin Franklin and the lead organizer of the Exposition's Women’s Pavilion for art by women, founded the Associate Committee of Women to support a permanent museum and served as its first president. The Pennsylvania Museum and School of Industrial Art was chartered in February 1876 and in 1877 the museum opened to the public. Wilstach certainly knew Gillespie and was strongly influenced by her, as can be seen in the codicils to her will referring to the museum. Her bequest in 1892 benefitted a great many local women's charity organizations, including the Philadelphia School of Design for Women. She left her entire art collection to the city, but also a half a million dollars in an endowment that enabled the museum to purchase works by James Abbott McNeill Whistler and George Inness in 1895, and The Annunciation by Henry Ossawa Tanner in 1899.

Though few works from her original collection are still in the collection, a selection follows:

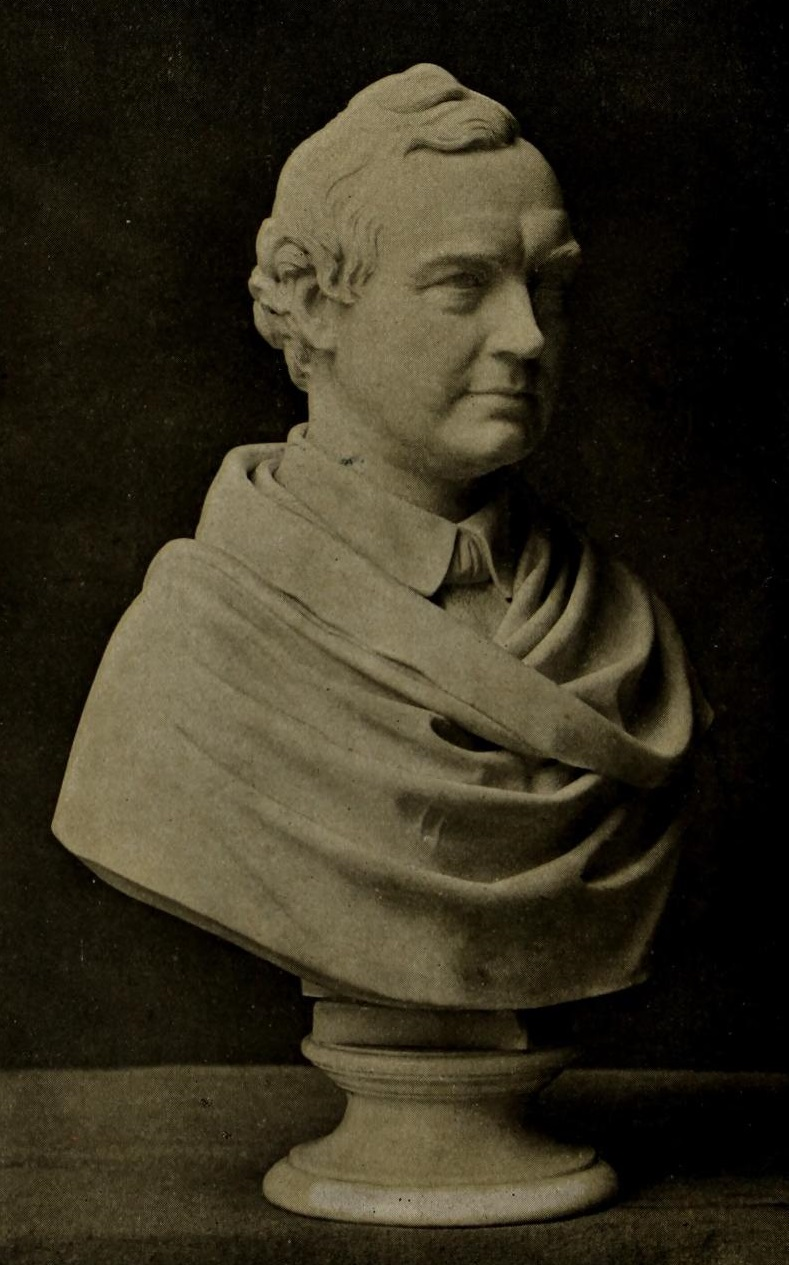
Bust of her husband by William Henry Rinehart

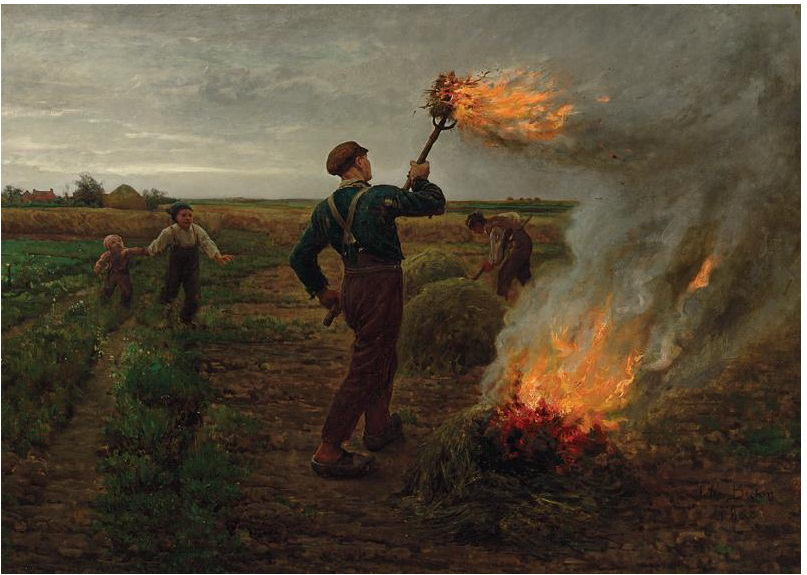
Burning Tares in a Wheatfield, by Jules Breton

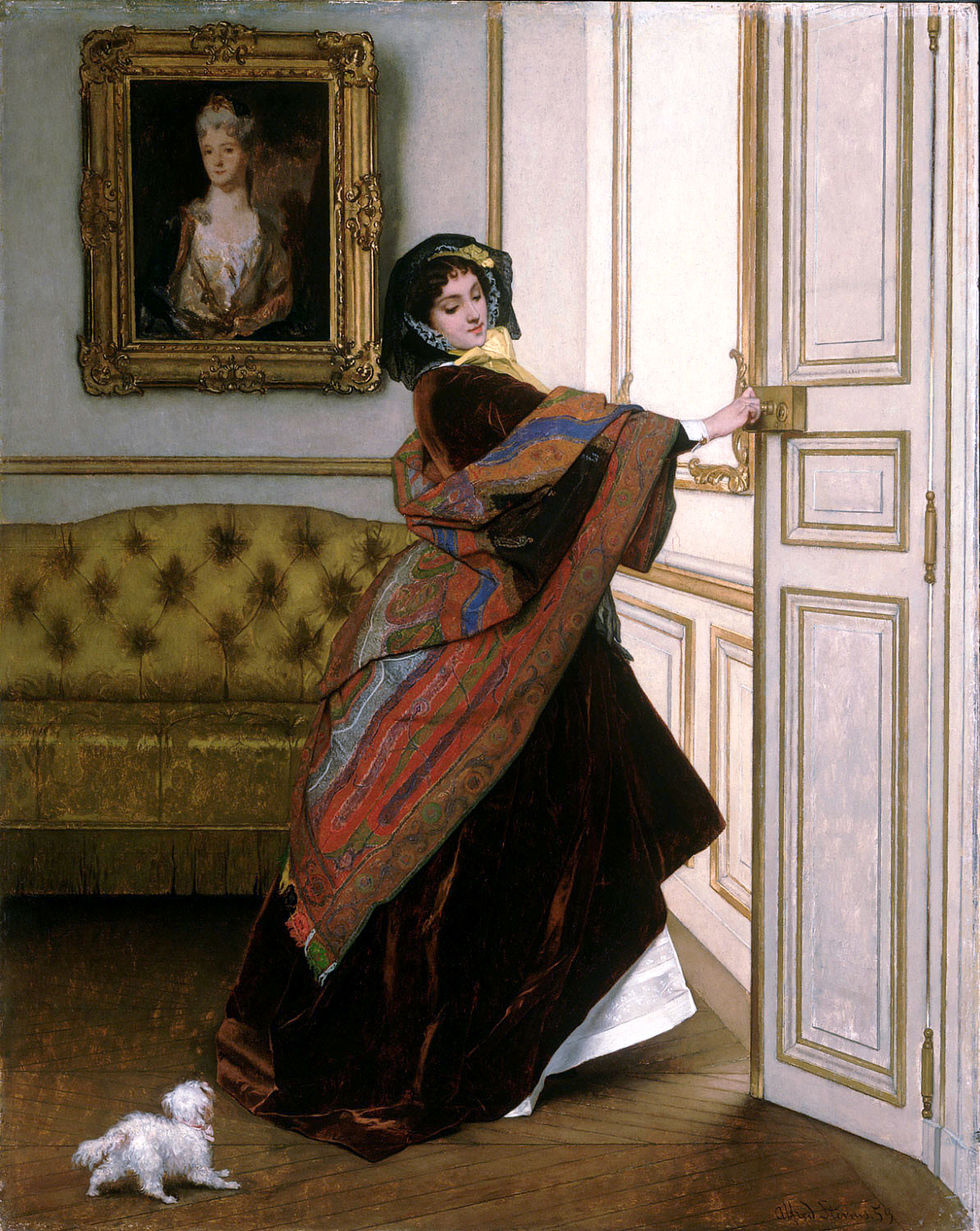
Will you go with me, Fido?, by Alfred Stevens (painter)

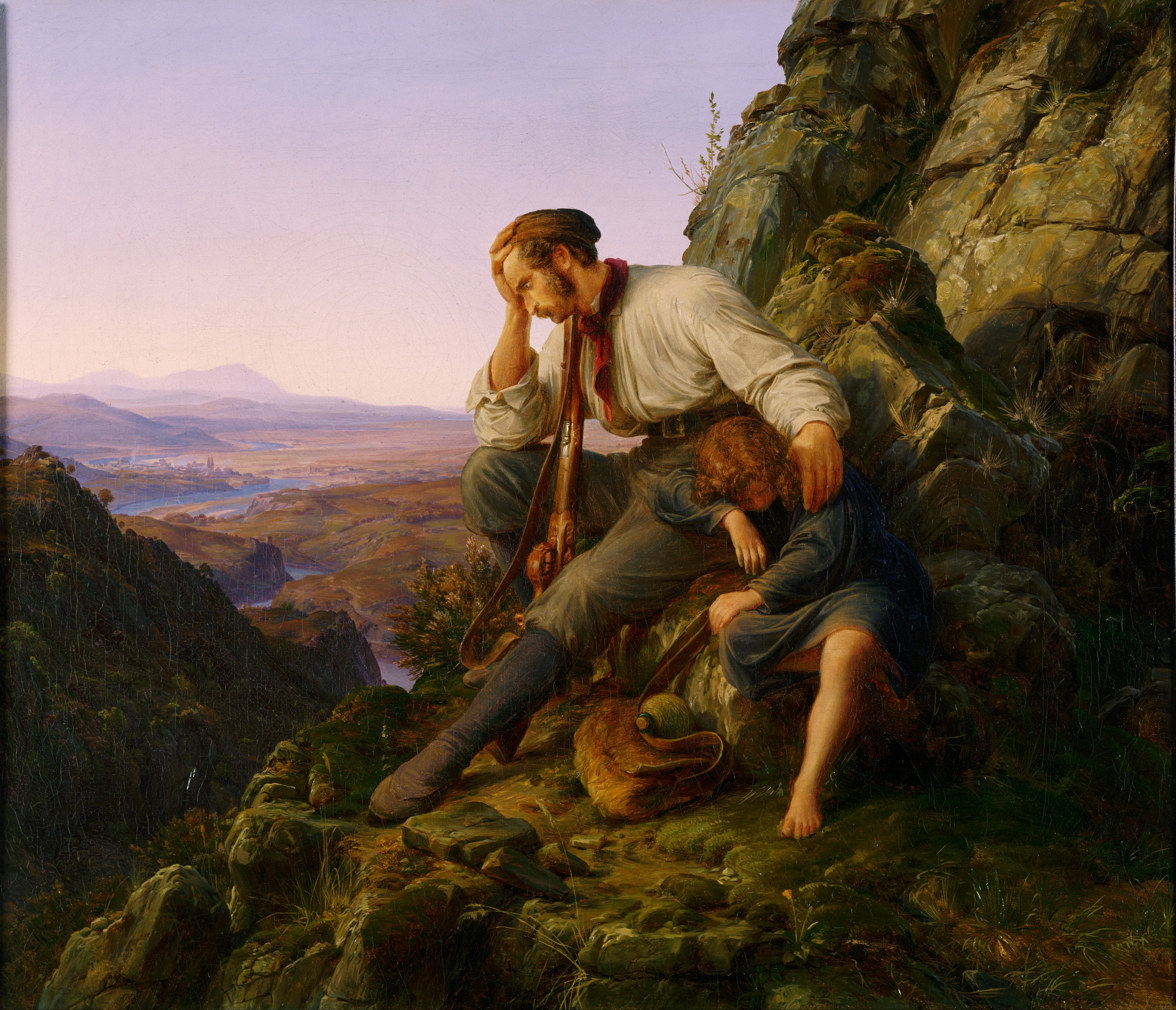
The Robber and His Child, by Karl Friedrich Lessing
