= Pelham Road =

Street in Bronx / Westchester, New York

- Shore Road; County Route 65
- Maintained by: NYCDOT and Westchester County
- Length: 4.7 mi (7.6 km)
- Location: The Bronx and Westchester County
- South end: I-95 / Pelham Parkway in Pelham Bay Park
- Major junctions: Hutchinson River Parkway in Pelham Bay Park
- North end: Echo Avenue in New Rochelle

Pelham Road, known as Shore Road within the Bronx, is a historic 4.1-mile (6.6 km) north–south road that runs along the Long Island Sound shoreline from Pelham Bay Park in the Bronx through the southern Westchester County, New York communities of New Rochelle and Pelham Manor. The thoroughfare had its beginning as a Native American trail linking the important villages on Davenport Neck to those on Pelham Neck in Pelham. Between these points along the shore line there was an almost continuous chain of small Indian villages and camps. This waterfront area was especially advantageous, with many small coves in secure harbors and protected by adjacent islands and many small streams of water and abundant springs.

The segment of Pelham Road in Westchester County is internally designated, but not signed, as County Route 65.

== History ==
From early times, the section of the road from New Rochelle to the Pelham Town line was called the "way to Mr. Pell's" and "Road to Pell's Manor". Once at the Town of Pelham, the road was merely a private way of the Pells' through their Manor. There was little need for a public highway beyond that point for the manor was private property, and was of little importance to New Rochelle settlers who were not tenants of the Lord of the Manor and held their land practically free of all manorial rights.

The Huguenot settlers of New Rochelle, in laying out their home lots from the Boston Road to the waterfront, crossed the trail with each lot, which was thereby cut into two parts. These lots were largely taken up by settlers interested in commercial enterprises north of the waterfront. Once the present Center Avenue, Drake Avenue and Weyman Avenue were opened to the shore from the Boston Road, public landings were built at their ends along the waterfront. By 1710, there were more than twice the number of houses along the New Rochelle shore as in the central part of the town on the Boston Road, however, the original Indian trail had still not been officially laid out as a road.

Cooper-shops were put up along the shore and, as other trades increased, the neighborhood became more and more important as a business district. A patent was issued on November 20, 1754, to Samuel Rodman and John Wooley who established a ferry across the Sound to Cow Neck, Long Island and, in 1785, another ferry was established by Richard Sands, both landing adjacent to the Pelham Road. ". From this time on, for a century or more, Pelham Road more than held its own in competition with the Boston Road, although the latter had the advantage of being the through route from New York City to Boston, and was the stagecoach and mail route.

As early as 1829, the steamboat came to Pelham Road as a means of travel. The early boats landed at Town Dock Road, but they were transferred before 1833 to a new dock on Neptune Island, where they continued to land thereafter. This was followed by the building of the Neptune House hotel on that island in 1837. Before this, a bridge had been erected across Eastchester Bay and a direct road opened connecting with Westchester Village, West Farms, Morrisania and New York City. These added to the importance of the Pelham Road by making it a major through route.

The opening of the New York and New Haven Railroad in 1849 and the rapid development of traffic by train, rather than by boats or stagecoach, caused Pelham Road to dwindle in significance as a through route for travel. The business that had developed from the early days of the settlement along its route, gradually gave way to the rapid increase along the railroad route and the Boston Turnpike (Main Street).

After the incorporation of the Village of New Rochelle (1857), the section of the road west of Center Avenue came to be called Pelham Road. In 1886, the New Rochelle and Pelham Railroad (horse-cars), was constructed along Shore Road from Center Avenue to the Neptune House Road, to connect with the ferry to Starin's Glen Island and the Government ferry to Davids Island. In 1898, an electric trolley line was substituted for the horse-cars, coming through Drake Avenue, and the tracks on Pelham Road were removed from Drake Avenue to Center Avenue. In 1928, by action of Westchester County, the road was widened and straightened over its entire length and became a through route for travel between New York City and New England points.

== Present day ==
The irregularly meandering waterfront has been populated from the days of the Siwanoy Indians. Today, it is dotted by a series of water related businesses as well as private homes, and a number of private clubs and marinas. Davenport Neck juts into the Sound at the foot of Franklin Avenue. Once the provenance of the Davenport and Iselin families who maintained spacious estates on the Neck, it was subdivided into building lots, and with the exception of a few historic homes, is essentially a residential neighborhood built during the last third of the Twentieth Century.

The area directly along Pelham Road is one of the more densely populated residential sections of the city consisting of mid-rise apartment buildings, condominiums, and town-home complexes. It is the only major through route in the area and connects the affluent residential communities on Davenport's Neck and along the shore with the Downtown business district and northern New Rochelle.

A number of parks and recreational areas are located here. Glen Island, at the south end of the City, contains Glen Island Park. Neptune Park is located at the foot of Fort Slocum Road on Neptune Island. Hudson Park, and the City's public beach, is located at Bonnefoy Point on the eastern end of Davenport Neck. The New Rochelle Rowing Club and the New Rochelle Municipal Marina are located adjacent to the north side of the park. On Echo Bay, the north end of the shoreline, are Five Islands Park, Clifford Island, Echo Island and Premium Point.

The College of New Rochelle, with its landmark "Castleview", is located in this area as is the late 1800s planned community Residence Park neighborhood.
