= Premium =

Premium may refer to:

== Marketing ==
- Premium (marketing), a promotional item that can be received for a small fee when redeeming proofs of purchase that come with or on retail products
- Premium segment, high-price brands or services in marketing, e.g.:
  - Premium business model, offering high end products and services
  - Premium domain
  - Premium email, a marketing term used by for-profit email services
  - Premium fare, a higher fare on a public transport service
  - Premium gasoline, a grade of gasoline, with the highest octane rating
  - Premium beer, marketing term for beer
  - Premium Processing Service, service offered by the United States Citizenship and Immigration Services
  - Premium Residency, a Saudi residence permit
  - Premium station, a class of railway stations on Metlink in Melbourne
  - Premium television, a class of subscription-based television service
  - Premium texting, SMS used for delivering digital content
  - Premium-rate telephone number, telephone numbers for which prices higher than normal are charged

=== Brands ===
- Premium-Cola, a brand of cola from Germany
- Premium Brands Holdings Corporation, a Canadian specialty food manufacturing and distribution company
- Premium Outlets, a brand of shopping malls
- Premium Records, an American record label
- Premium Saltines, a Nabisco brand of saltine crackers

== Monetary ==
- Risk premium, monetary difference between the guaranteed and possible returns on an investment
- Insurance premium, money charged for coverage in an insurance policy
  - Deposit premium, a type of insurance premium
- Option premium, the price of an option
- Premium tax credit, a refundable tax credit in the United States
- Premium Bond, a type of bond available in the United Kingdom
- Buyer's premium, a charge to be paid in addition to the cost of an item

== Places ==
- Premium, Kentucky, the post office for Hot Spot, Kentucky
- Premium Mill-Pond, mill-pond in Westchester County, New York
- Premium Plaza, Ndola, residential flats building in Zambia
- Premium Plaza, office building in Bucharest, Romania
- Premium River - Pine Brook Wetlands, river in Westchester County, New York

== Other uses ==
- Premium (film), a 2006 film starring Dorian Missick and Zoe Saldana
- Rai Premium, an Italian television channel
