= All View Estate =

Building in New York, United States

Coordinates: 40.907559°N 73.760124°W

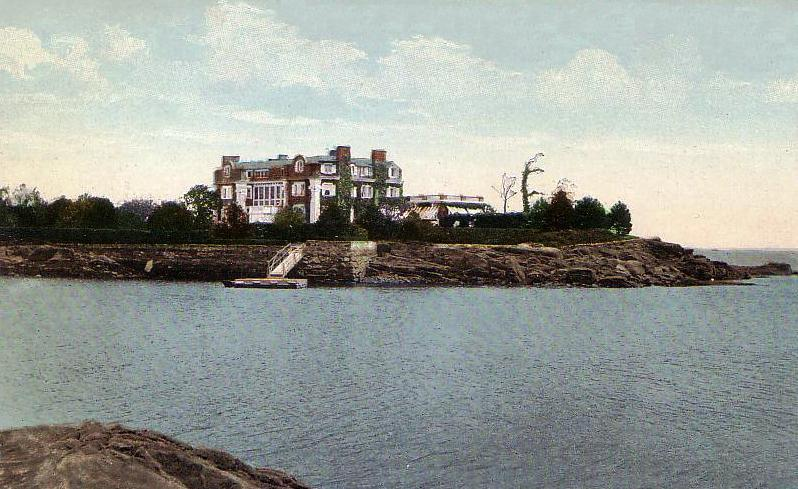

All View is a historic, 28 room estate home located on the Long Island Sound shore in the gated, Premium Point community of New Rochelle, in Westchester County, New York. The designer was Stanford White of McKim, Mead and White. It sits on 2.82 acres at the end of the Premium Point peninsula overlooking New Rochelle's upper most harbor, Echo Bay.

The 23,000 square foot home has 13 bedrooms, 13 baths, nine fireplaces, a movie theater, and four kitchens. The grounds were designed by landscape architect Frederick Law Olmsted, creator of New York's Central Park.

== Architecture ==
The home is on a bluff at the end of a rocky, angled stretch of the Premium Point Peninsula. The site immediately adjacent to Echo Island borders Premium Mill-Pond, Echo Bay and Long Island Sound.

== History ==
The brick home was built in 1890 for Charles Oliver Iselin, son of wealthy Wall Street financier and railroad magnate Adrian G Iselin. C. Oliver was one of the most famous yachtsmen of the time and a five-time defender of the America's Cup. He built a breakwater in Echo Bay so that he could safely dock his yachts including the Vigilant, Defender and Columbia next to his home. Iselin's second wife Hope Goddard Iselin was the first woman to serve as part of the crew on an America's Cup yacht. Iselin hosted many of the most prominent members of society at the home including the Vanderbilts and Morgans, as well as dignitaries and royalty. The estate was purchased in the 1980s by the former UN ambassador and late Nigerian billionaire Antonio Deinde Fernandez, who added two wings to the house. In 2018 the building was sold for $16 million.
