= Page Morton Black =

American cabaret singer (1915–2013)

Page Morton (1915–2013) was an American cabaret singer who married William Black, founder of the catering and coffee business Chock full o'Nuts. As Page Morton Black she was known for singing the "Heavenly Coffee" jingle on the company's televised advertisements and sponsored broadcasts. When Black died in 1983, she took over his charitable work with the Parkinson's Disease Foundation.

== Background ==
Morton was born Page L. Mergentheim on October 15, 1912 and raised in Winnetka, Illinois. Her father was Morton Adolf Mergentheim, a lawyer and professor of law working in the Chicago area. For a period he was a partner in the law firm of Sigmund Zeisler. Her mother, Rose Heymann, was a classically trained pianist who had studied with Fannie Bloomfield Zeisler, wife of Sigmund. Morton's only sibling was Morton Alexander Mergentheim who was about 3 years older. They were both educated at New Trier High School in Winnetka, Illinois where her highest grade was 4th year.

== Career ==
Morton came from an affluent family but her father lost his money on the markets so she moved to New York with her mother to find work. In 1940 at the age of 18 she was living with her mother on East 43rd Street, having changed her name from Mergentheim to Morton. Her occupation in the 1940 census was given as model, and one newspaper of the period indicates that she was connected to the John Robert Powers modelling agency. When her father died in 1943, his obituary described her as an actress with the stage name of Page Morton.

Morton studied singing in New York City with Merle Alcock, a contralto with the Metropolitan Opera. During the 1940s and '50s she sang and played piano in various New York clubs, hotel bars and restaurants including the Warwick Hotel's Raleigh Room, Café Pierre, the Vanderbilt and the Sherry-Netherland. The band leader Guy Lombardo saw her perform in the Pierre and suggested to William Black that she could sing the advertising jingle for Chock full o’Nuts coffee. In the 1960s Morton started to work on radio and television shows. She appeared on the Guy Lombardo New Year's Eve special, sponsored by the Chock full o’Nuts company. In 1961 she had her own radio programmes, and appeared on two further New Year's Eve specials, one hosted by Lombardo and the other by Xavier Cugat. She released her first album for MGM called May You Always and sang a duet with Jimmy Durante advertising the coffee brand.

== Marriage ==
William Black had started his business by selling nuts from a stand on Broadway with a $250 start-up fund. As the company grew, he began selling his own vacuum-packed blend of coffee that eventually accounted for 60% of his multi-million dollar turnover. In 1951 he divorced his first wife and married singer Jean Martin. She featured on sponsored radio and television programmes for Black and sang the "Heavenly Coffee" jingle. By 1960 Black and Martin were separated and divorced in 1962. Black married Morton in Connecticut on March 27, 1962.

After her marriage Morton featured for several years on the Chock full o’Nuts television advertisements and sang the "Heavenly Coffee" jingle. She also became a director of Chock full o’Nuts and worked with her husband's philanthropic ventures. Following the death of a friend and colleague in 1957, Black had contributed $100,000 to establish the Parkinson's Disease Foundation. Later he donated several million dollars to medical research. Morton became the unpaid secretary of the Foundation and following the death of her husband in 1983, she took over his role as the chairperson and remained so until 2012.

== Bon Repos ==
When Morton married Black, they lived in a waterfront house called Bon Repos in Premium Point, New Rochelle, New York. Black purchased the 29-room mansion in 1955 from Tommy Manville and lived there with his second wife, Jean Martin, until their separation. Morton's mother Rose and her brother Alexander also lived in New Rochelle; Rose died in 1971 and Alexander in 1979.

William Black died in March 1983 while he was still the chairman of Chock full o’Nuts. The business became the subject of a proxy battle with businessman Jerry Finkelstein, owner of the New York Law Journal. He hoped to take control, but when Black died, the directors appointed Dr. Leon Purdy as their new chairman. He had been Morton's physician several year earlier and she introduced him to her husband. Purdy first became a director of Chock full o’Nuts, later president, vice chairman and chief operating officer before his appointment as chairman.

== Parkinson's Disease Foundation ==
Morton was the chairperson at the Parkinson's Disease Foundation for nearly 30 years. When she died in 2013, the Foundation published a paid notice in The New York Times with their condolences and appreciation of her work saying that "the Board of Directors, the staff, the supporters, and the many hundreds of scientists funded by the Parkinson's Disease Foundation (PDF) mourn the passing, and cherish the memory, of an exemplary, passionate and indefatigable leader...Page served brilliantly as our Chairman- strengthening us with her inspired nominations to our Board, enriching us with her deft leadership of our annual Bal du Printemps, and energizing us with her single-minded devotion to the reputation, success and financial health of our organization."

The Columbia University Medical Center also published a similar piece mourning the passing of Page Morton Black. They said her "friendship, advocacy and philanthropy were indispensable in our fight against Parkinson's disease. As Chair of the Board of Directors of the Parkinson's Disease Foundation, Mrs. Black carried the mantle established by her late husband, William Black -- their generosity made possible the construction of the William Black Medical Research Building on our campus, and the creation of our Center for Parkinson's Disease and Other Movement Disorders, which continues its pioneering research and patient care."

She died on July 21, 2013; her interment was private but a celebration of her life was held at Frank E. Campbell Funeral Chapel on September 12, 2013.
