= William Black (businessman) =

American businessman

William Black (c. 1902 – March 7, 1983) was an American businessman and philanthropist who founded Chock full o'Nuts. He was known as a considerate employer who provided benefits, such as medical insurance, pension plans and bonuses, for his predominantly African-American employees. He also donated millions of dollars to medical research.

== Early years ==
Black was originally named William Schwarz, but changed his name to Black during the 1940s. There is some uncertainty about his year of birth and his country of origin. He claimed to have been born in Bushwick, Brooklyn, in 1904, but may have been older. According to members of his family, he was born in a village in Lithuania, then part of the Russian Empire, in the 1880s, emigrating with his family when he was four years old. He worked nights to pay for his education and, in 1926, graduated from Columbia University, New York, with a degree in engineering. He failed to find suitable employment, so with a start-up fund of $250, he began selling nuts to passers-by from a stand located on Broadway and Forty-Third Street. The venture was profitable, and within six years Black had expanded his business to 18 small stores called Chock Full o'Nuts.

Sales dipped during the Great Depression, so Black adapted by converting his outlets to short-order luncheonettes. He sold low-cost food such as nutted cheese sandwiches on whole wheat raisin bread, prepared in view of the customers. Staff were forbidden to touch the food and used tongs and spatulas to handle the ingredients. Black also opened a bakery and started to roast his own blend of coffee. This became a popular vacuum packed brand and, by 1960, accounted for 60% of the company's $30 million in revenues.

== Business methods ==
Black believed that his success in business came from a common sense approach. He maintained high standards of hygiene by visiting and inspecting his restaurants late at night, occasionally being mistaken for a burglar. 90% of his workforce were African-Americans, and in 1957 he employed former Brooklyn Dodgers star Jackie Robinson as a vice-president in charge of the company's welfare and minority programs. Employees, from counter hands to executives, received fringe benefits including sickness and medical insurance, pension plans, interest-free loans, profit sharing and bonuses. Despite his generous nature, the organization was run on strict lines, and Black would not tolerate dissent.

In 1958, Black sold a major holding in his company in the form of 400,000 shares. These were initially priced at $15 each, but eventually sold at $20.

Black tended to be impulsive, and in 1974, despite having no experience in the industry, purchased the ailing beer brewing firm Rheingold for $1. He failed to turn the company around, and in 1977 sold it to Christian Schmidt Brewing Company of Philadelphia.

== Philanthropist ==
In 1957, following the death of a friend and colleague, Black contributed $100,000 to establish the Parkinson's Disease Foundation. In 1960, he provided $5 million funding towards a medical research center at his old Columbia University alma mater, named the William Black Building. Other gifts included $1 million towards a building at the Lenox Hill Hospital, named the William Black Hall of Nursing, funding for the Montefiore New Rochelle Hospital and funding for the Page and William Black Post-Graduate School for Continuing Education at the Icahn School of Medicine at Mount Sinai.

== Personal life and death ==
Black married three times: His first wife was Lillian Mandl (1895–1984), with whom he had two daughters. Black divorced her in 1951 (though she remained treasurer of the Chock Full o'Nuts business) and married divorcee Jean Martin (1919–2004), who was a singer on his sponsored television shows. They had one child, a daughter, before divorcing in 1962.

His last wife was Page Morton (1915–2013), who was also a singer, and made famous the Chock Full o'Nuts "Heavenly Coffee" jingle on radio and television. After Black's death, she carried on his charitable work with the Parkinson Disease Foundation. Physician, Dr. Leon Pordy, who had been introduced to Black by Page Morton some 20 years earlier, became chairman and chief executive of Chock Full o'Nuts after Black's death. Page Morton Black died in 2013 at Premium Point, New Rochelle, New York, in her home Bon Repos that her husband had purchased from Thomas Franklyn Manville, Jr. in the 1950s. The ownership of the house had been contested during the divorce between Black and Jean Martin in 1962.

Black's eldest daughter, Wilma (Willy), married Donald E. Werby, hotel owner in California. His second daughter, Barbara Jane, married Irish diplomat Eamon Lucas Kennedy.

Black died of cancer at the age of 80.
