= Premium River - Pine Brook Wetlands =

Wetlands in New York, United States

Coordinates: 40.934°N 73.747°W

The Premium River - Pine Brook Wetlands are located on Long Island Sound in the City of New Rochelle, Town of Mamaroneck, and the Village of Larchmont in Westchester County, New York. The fish and wildlife habitat is an approximately 65 acre area including Pine Brook south of the Boston Post Road, the Premium River, Premium Mill-Pond, the northeast portion of Echo Bay, and Pryer Manor Marsh. The land area bordering the wetlands complex is predominantly moderate density residential and commercial. The portion of the habitat area within Mamaroneck and Larchmont was designated as a 'Critical Environmental Area' under the State Environmental Quality Review Act.

== Fish and wildlife values ==
The Premium River - Pine Brook Wetlands area is a diverse and relatively undeveloped complex of tidal river, tidal flats, shallows, salt marsh and freshwater wetlands which is unusual in Westchester County. Although adjacent and upstream developments and water pollution have degraded this area, the wetland complex remains undeveloped and the range of natural communities in this area support a diversity of fish and wildlife species. Local efforts are underway to preserve, maintain and restore the wetlands. As an initial step, the Department of State has funded the development of a wetland restoration and management plan for the Town of Mamaroneck and the Village of Larchmont.

The productive salt marshes, tidal flats and shallows serve as nursery and feeding areas for a variety of finfish species including alewife, striped bass, blackfish, bluefish, cod, eel, winter flounder, summer flounder, mackerel, menhaden, porgy, weakfish, silversides and killifish. Shellfish found in the area include hard clam, soft clam, blue mussel, American oyster and bay scallop. Although the area was once used for planting and harvesting oysters, the entire area is now closed to shell-fishing due to degraded water quality (high coliform levels).

A variety of coastal wildlife species occur in and around the Premium River - Pine Brook Wetlands. Nesting bird species include black-crowned night heron, ring-necked pheasant, mallard, Canada goose, mute swan and killdeer. Many species of waterfowl, shorebirds, marsh birds and passerine species feed in the area as residents during the summer and also during spring and fall migrations. Large concentrations of black duck occur during migrations and in recent years, osprey have been observed migrating through the area. Overwintering species include common loon, American coot, greater scaup, lesser scaup, northern shoveler, mallard, common goldeneye, canvasback, common merganser, hooded merganser and red-breasted merganser. The use of this area by waterfowl in winter is influenced by the extent of ice cover on Premium Mill Pond.

== Impact assessment ==
The combination of this area's diverse natural communities and wildlife and its proximity to New York City and the densely populated region of Westchester County makes the Premium River - Pine Brook Wetlands area significant for informal nature study, birding, photography, environmental education and research. Any activity that would further degrade the water quality in Premium, River, Pine Brook, Premium Mill Pond and associated wetlands would impair the biological productivity of this area. Species of fish and wildlife may be affected by water pollution such as chemical contamination, oil spills, excessive sedimentation, waste disposal, and sewage discharges. Efforts should be made to improve water quality in the area by controlling runoff and waste discharge from adjacent and upstream commercial and residential areas and by improving tidal flushing. Elimination of freshwater wetlands, salt marsh and inter-tidal areas through excavation or filling, would result in a direct loss of valuable habitat area. Natural plant communities bordering the wetlands should be maintained to provide cover for wildlife, erosion control, and buffer zones.
