= Shore Road =

Shore Road may refer to:

- Shore Road, Belfast, the A2 through north Belfast and Newtownabbey in Northern Ireland
- Pelham Road or Shore Road, connecting Long Island Sound to the Bronx in New York
