= Jean Martin (singer) =

- Born: Elta Jean Martin; December 6, 1919; Cisco, Texas, United States
- Died: March 2, 2004 (aged 84) New York, United States
- Occupations: Singer, actor
- Spouses: George Harvey (m. 1939); Peter Joseph Pirrone (m. 1946–1949); William Black (m. 1951–1961)

Jean Martin (1919–2004) was an American singer and actor. Born in Texas, she moved to New York and worked in radio and television during the 1950s. She was married to William Black, who was the founder of the Chock full o'Nuts restaurant chain and coffee brand.

== Early life ==
Elta Jean Martin was born on December 6, 1919, in Cisco, Texas. The family moved to Abilene, Texas, where Martin went to high school, graduating in 1938. Whilst at the school she was a member of the Wig and Mask, and the Cyclo-Drama dramatic clubs. On February 25, 1939, she married George Berry Harvey, who was a fellow graduate of the Abilene High School. He qualified to be a mortician and the couple moved to Houston, where George worked at the Laughter Undertaking Company.

Martin, who had previously been involved with beauty contests, moved to New York in 1945 with the intention of becoming a photographic model. She and her first husband parted and in 1946 she married Peter Joseph Pirrone (1913-1992), who was described as an employment agency manager in New York. Her first husband, George Harvey, remained in Houston where he died in a shooting incident in 1958.

== Singing career ==
Singer/bandleader Rudy Vallée heard Martin sing at a party and he invited her to try out with his orchestra. He gave her advice and helped her to develop a style referred to as torch singing. After this she obtained bookings at venues such as George Gay’s Club ’78 and the La Rue nightclub. Later she worked on radio and television with Sammy Kaye, Morey Amsterdam, Jerry Lester and John Conte. She also had her own show called "Jean Martin Sings" on ABC, which ran for 26 weeks.

Martin’s recordings included: Who He's; Another Door Opens; Yum, Yum, Yummy and Tanto-Tanto. She also released an album called “Please Be Gentle With Me” that was re-released in 2013.

== Life with William Black ==
In 1949 Martin divorced her second husband in Reno, Nevada, and in 1951 married William Black the founder of the restaurant chain and coffee brand, Chock Full o’Nuts. Martin appeared on several of Black’s sponsored radio and television shows and sang the "Heavenly Coffee" jingle. In 1955 Martin's previous husband, Peter J Pirrone, attempted to have the Reno divorce nullified in the State Supreme Court, claiming that papers had not been served correctly and that Black had been pursuing his wife before the divorce. Pirrone lost the case; the judge said that Martin had fulfilled all of the requirements for the divorce.

Black, who already had two adult daughters from his previous marriage, became a father again in 1955 when Martin gave birth to a baby girl. At about this time Black purchased a family home on Premium Point, New Rochelle, New York, called Bon Repos. The previous owner of the water front property had been Thomas Franklyn Manville Jr. The marriage between Black and Martin did not last, they parted in 1960 and in 1961 the couple divorced. Claims and counter claims for money and property were made between the couple disputing the ownership of Bon Repos and $1 million worth of bonds.

== Later life ==
In 1961 it was widely reported that Jean Martin had been seriously ill due to a breakdown and in the following years she slipped from public view. She died March 2, 2004, in New York.
