= Crystal Lake (New Rochelle, New York) =

Former lake in the village of New Rochelle, New York

- Jefferd-Leisler Mill Pond; Ice Pond
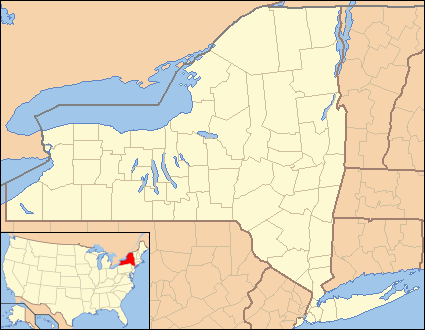
- Location within New York City Location within Long Island Location within New York
- Interactive map of Crystal Lake
- Location: New Rochelle, New York
- Coordinates: 40.9216°N 73.7797°W
- Type: Former lake
- Primary inflows: Stephenson Brook
- Primary outflows: Long Island Sound
- Basin countries: United States

Crystal Lake (also known Jefferd-Leisler Mill Pond and Ice Pond) was located in the village of New Rochelle in Westchester County, New York. It originally supplied early colonial mills with water power. It was fed by Stephenson Brook, which rises just north of Paine Lake and drains the large watershed adjacent to North Avenue from beyond Quaker Ridge Road.

The lake appears to have existed as a natural sheet of water, near the end of the brook. It had two outlets into Long Island Sound, one at the present Stephenson Boulevard, and the other at the east side of Lispenard Avenue. These outlets had an abrupt fall in the few yards between the lake's south edge and the Long Island Sound shore, of approximately 20–25 ft (6.1–7.6 m). This was the greatest natural fall of any stream emptying into the Sound between New York City and Connecticut. From very early, the value of it for water power was recognized.

== Mills and industry ==
According to the 1689 deed from Sir John Pell to Jacob Leisler, representing the Huguenot purchasers of New Rochelle, the area originally came under the ownership of John Jefferd. Jefferd was first to use the water power of this stream, operating a sawmill and gristmill until he died in the early eighteenth century. The land later came under the ownership of Jacob Leisler, who made improvements to the lake, including constructing a pool to supply an overshot wheel at the mill, which needed Leisler to alter the route of the Boston Post Road, an action which he was later indicted for in 1711. This pool was south of and beside the lake, and required several new mill-dams and shifting the road to a new route over the lower dam. This raised the level of the lake and flooded a larger area than the natural lake.

In 1734 the property came under the ownership of Antony Lispenard, who erected an additional sawmill between the lake and the pool, using the water flowing from the lake into the pool before it was drawn from the pool to the old gristmill below. By 1750, this sawmill was converted to a gristmill as well. By the terms of Lispenard's will, the lake, pool and two mills became the property of his daughter Abigail, wife of Jacobus Bleecker. Before the Revolutionary War, their ownership passed to Andrew Abramse, whose wife was another daughter of Antony Lispenard, In 1795. the lake and old mill were bought by John Searing and Samuel Wood, both Quakers. No trace has been found after the Revolutionary War of the second mill erected by Lispenard, and all knowledge of its former existence was lost.

In the same year 1795, the owner of the lands adjoining the lake on the north gave permission for to raise the dam and flood more land. By 1806 the former milling industry shifted away from the area; however the lake continued to be used to impound water to operate a tannery, distillery and button factory before the factory burned while being fitted up as an ink factory for Thaddeus Davids in 1846.

Crystal Lake is situated just north of the Davenport Neck peninsula, the location of the historic Lispenard–Rodman–Davenport House, which is also associated with Jacob Leister and the Lispenard family.

== "Crystal Lake Ice" ==
An ice industry was soon set up collecting ice when the lake froze. 1849, Thomas Andrews bought the lake and mill property to further develop the ice business. Large ice houses were erected south of the Boston Road in the present City Yard, and a runway was constructed across the road for the ice. This ice industry eventually developed into one of the most important in the region. The ice was all taken for the New York City and Brooklyn markets by the Brooklyn Ice Company, being transported by boats which landed at a dock adjoining the ice-houses. Recognized for the purity of its waters, the lake became known as "Crystal Lake", with its ice marketed as "Crystal Lake Ice."

== Health concerns ==
By now, the very large amount of malarial fevers in the town had become a matter of public concern, and it was continually charged that the origin of the disease was traceable to the stagnant condition of this lake. Whether this was true is questionable, since the town had large areas of undrained swamp lands throughout that were the same or more threat to public health. However, as by now industrial use of the water of the lake had ceased, the water stood undisturbed by drainage for longer than ever before.

The agitation increased so much that a move was made in 1864 to have the Town Board of Health condemn the lake as a public nuisance. Failing in this, the matter was brought before the State Board of Health. The Board, however, refused to act, having found that the lake had large quantities of fish of various kinds as in other fresh water lakes of the state. Additionally, the ice shipped to New York and Brooklyn was found to be of sufficient purity to meet the health test of those cities.

Failing in both of these efforts to compel the abatement of the lake as a public nuisance, John Stephenson, who had been the leader in the movement to rid the neighborhood of the alleged menace to health, and whose estate "Clifford" was near by, bought the lake and adjacent property himself. The dams were then demolished, and the water of the lake and pool let out into Echo Bay. The bed of the lake was reclaimed as dry land and the brook was confined between stone walls constructed to control its flow from the railroad embankment to the Boston Post Road. Streets were then laid out over the lake bottom and the surrounding property was developed as residential parks. In 1913 Stephenson School was built on a high point of land which had been an island in the middle of the lake, "Vineyard Island", known for its wild grapes. Main Street was straightened so that it now runs over the mill's old supply. The brook was enclosed in a culvert and now runs under and along the side of Stephenson Boulevard, and under Main Street into the bay.

== Additional Information ==
- NYHometownLocator - Crystal Lake (historic)
- (GNIS) - Crystal Lake detail
- Google Earth view of the area. Stephenson School is at the south corner of Stephenson Park.
