= Pine Island (New Rochelle) =

Island in New Rochelle, New York, United States

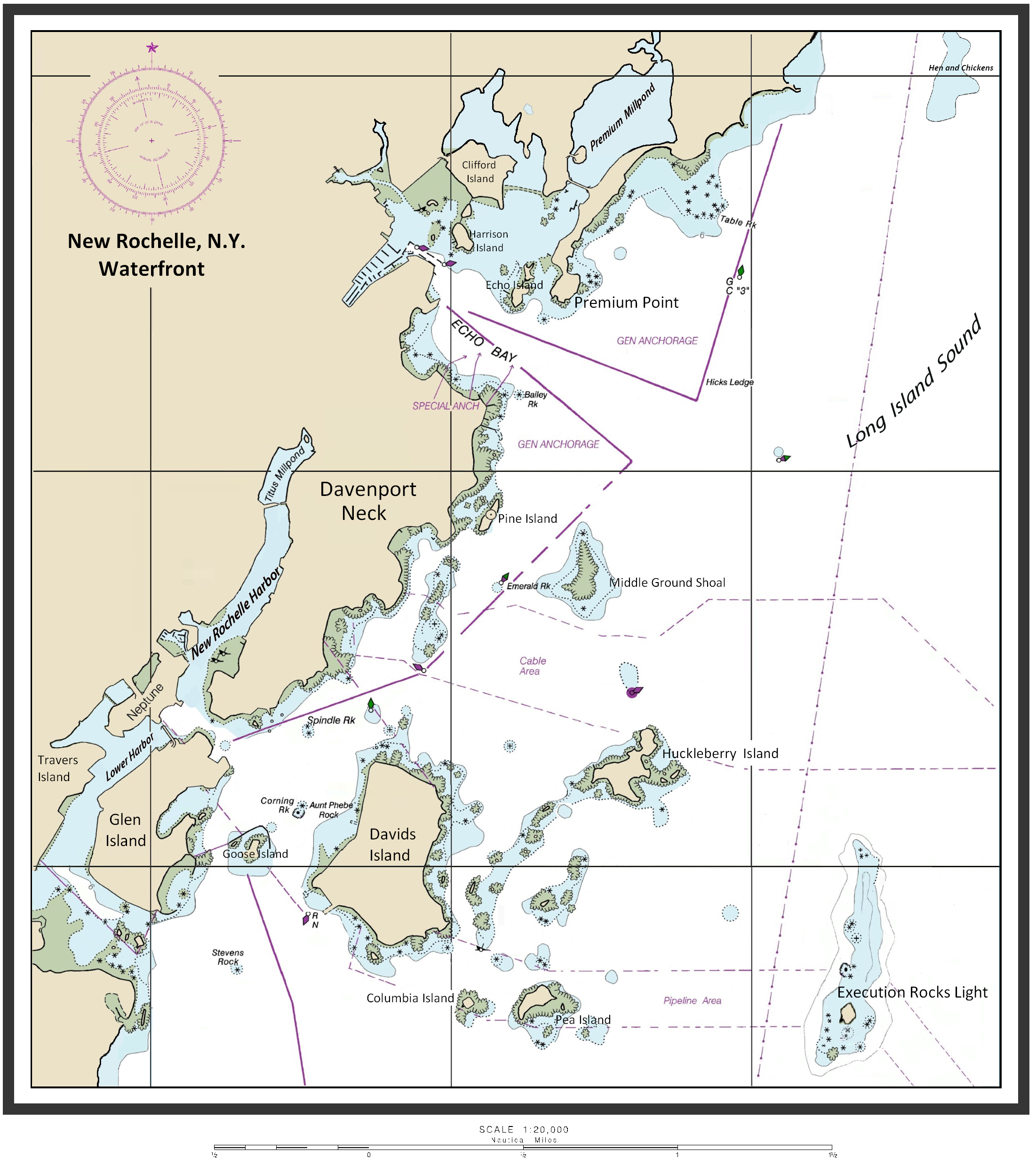
- Interactive map of Pine Island

Geography
- Location: Long Island Sound
- Coordinates: 40°53′53″N 73°45′53″W

Administration
- United States
- State: New York
- County: Westchester
- City: New Rochelle

Demographics
- Population: 0

Pine Island is a small, privately owned island in the city of New Rochelle in Westchester County, New York. The island is situated off the coast of Davenport Neck near Sans Souci Beach in Long Island Sound.
