= New Rochelle Rowing Club =

- Location: New Rochelle, NY
- Home water: Long Island Sound
- Founded: 1880
- Affiliations: USRowing

Notable members
- Cy Cromwell and Jim Storm,

The New Rochelle Rowing Club, located in New Rochelle, New York, was founded in 1880 and is one of the oldest athletic organizations in the United States. It is part of The New York Rowing Association which was founded in 1914, and has its roots in the Harlem Regatta Association which dates back to 1866.

Its first clubhouse was a one-story shed on the edge of Mill Pond and Church Street. In 1882 the club moved from its original site on Pelham Road, to its present location at the east end of Davenport Neck on Echo Bay. The first building at this site was lost to fire around 1900 and was immediately replaced by the current two-story clubhouse. The building is topped by an 1864 clock tower that was removed from the former city hall on Main Street when it was demolished in the 1960s. Club members restored the cupola and added it to the building in 1974.

In 1886 the young club defeated the renowned New York Athletic Club, winning its first rowing competition. The sport of rowing became significantly more popular starting in the 1880s. In its early years, the New Rochelle Rowing Club’s Annual Regatta attracted as many as 1000 members and spectators to the events on Echo Bay. As the club expanded, the club bought new boats, including new four oared gigs with which they went on to claim more racing titles. The popularity of eight oared rowing did not hit until 1908 when they borrowed a boat from the New York Athletic Club and won a major match race. Over the years, the club has won three national rowing championships. The national Intermediate Single Sculls title in 1920, another National title was captured in 1947, and a third in 1964. The club has also participated in numerous major meets. It was the home club of Cy Cromwell and Jim Storm, silver medalists in the 1964 Olympic Games in Tokyo.

Superstorm Sandy slammed New Rochelle's waterfront, with Hudson Park and its facilities bearing much of the brunt. The strong tidal surge heavily damaged the hundred-year-old NRRC clubhouse resulting in its questionable future. Calls for renovation and preservation of the structure as well as those for total demolition continue nearly two years after the hurricane.

== Links ==
- Blades of the World
