= Lispenard–Rodman–Davenport House =

Historic house in New York, United States

- U.S. National Register of Historic Places
- New York State Register of Historic Places
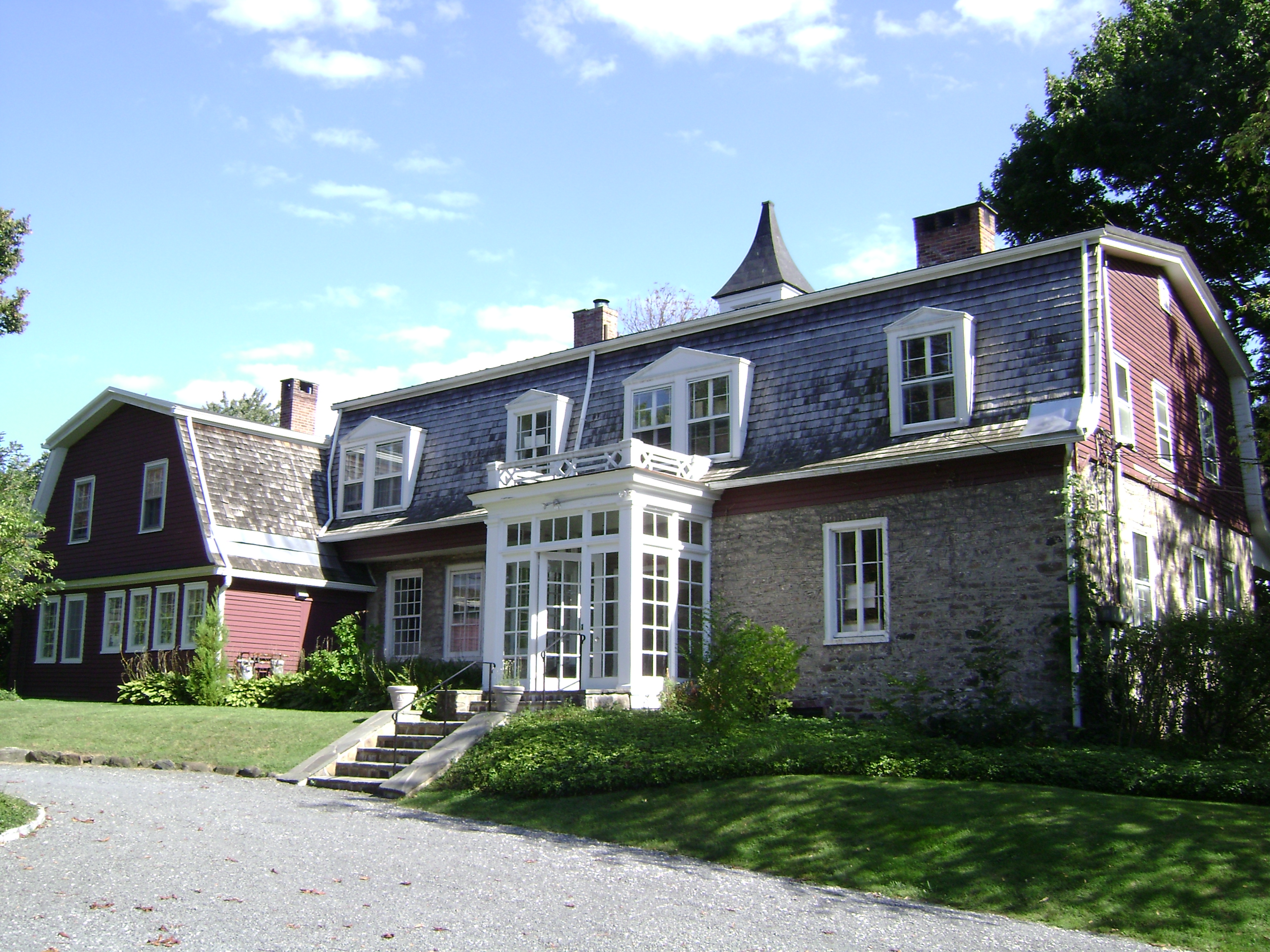
- Main building in 2014

- Location within New York City Location within New York Location within the United States
- Location: 180 Davenport Avenue, New Rochelle, New York
- Coordinates: 40°54′4″N 73°46′17″W
- Built: 1700
- Architectural style: Late Victorian, Picturesque
- NRHP reference No.: 86002637
- NYSRHP No.: 11942.000746

Significant dates
- Added to NRHP: September 22, 1986
- Designated NYSRHP: August 4, 1986

The Lispenard–Rodman–Davenport House is a historic residence dating back to the early 18th century located on the Davenport Neck peninsula in New Rochelle, New York. The house is the oldest residential structure in New Rochelle. It was listed on the National Register of Historic Places in 1986.

== History ==
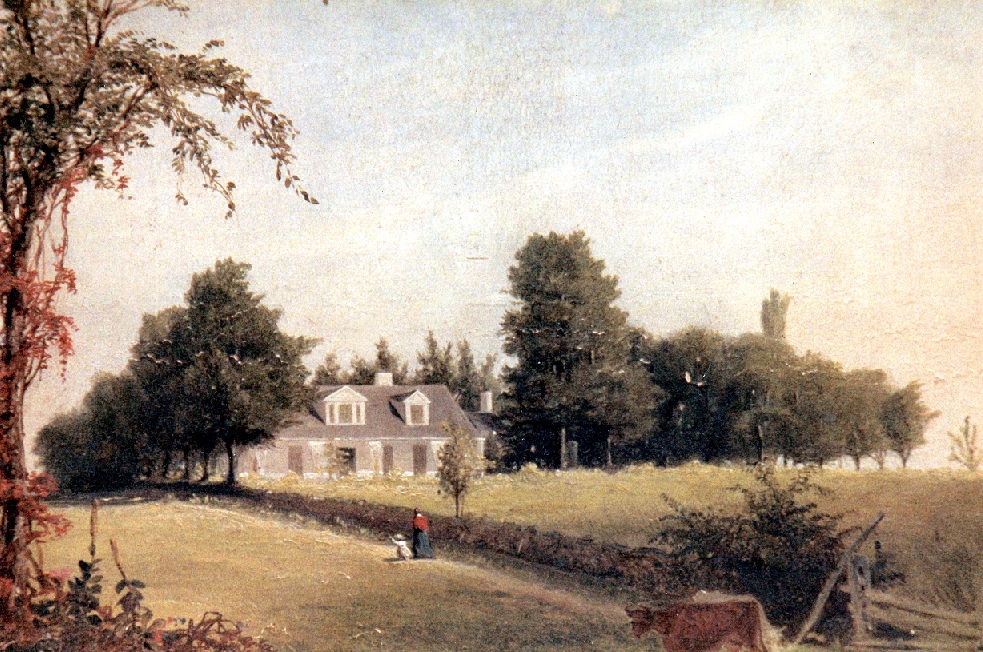
1814 oil painting of the house

In 1708 Antoine Lispenard bought from Jacob Leisler's son a half interest in the large peninsula, or "neck", jutting out from the mainland between New Rochelle Creek and Long Island Sound. Six years later he bought the other half. Across the inlet he built a dam and a tidal gristmill. Each incoming tide filled the millpond behind the dam, and then, as the tide ebbed, the water was released through a millrace to turn the mill wheel. Nearby the mill, on the neck itself, Lispenard built his home, a stone house of one-and-a-half stories, with the front eaves extending to form the roof of a wide porch.

In 1732 he sold his property to Joseph Rodman who later doubled the size of the house. By 1776 the house and Neck had passed to John R. Myers who owned it for the duration of the American Revolutionary War. During this brief period the house was used by the British as a hospital for their wounded soldiers.

In 1784 the property came into the possession of the Davenport family, and so is currently known as Davenport Neck. Generations of the Davenport family, and other owners after them made further changes to the house, so that the original structure built by Antoine Lispenard and Joseph Rodman is largely invisible. In the 1860s, the original roof was replaced by a modified mansard, topped by a cupola. Other features of the house include 20-inch-thick (510 mm) walls, 16-inch-wide (410 mm) pine floorboards and a 5 1/2-foot-wide (1.7 m) fireplace in the kitchen. Several Lispenard family grave-sites are also located on the property.

During the War of 1812, guards of the local militia were stationed in the neck to prevent a landing by the British fleet blockading the Sound. An incident erupted as the result of a relatively innocent encounter between an English landing party in search of fresh food and American sentries. Additional men were moved in and quartered in barns on the neck. The ensuing events, renowned locally as the Battle of Davenport's Neck, involved a false alarm that caused the entire militia to flee the area mistakenly believing they were under attack. In 1814, Newberry Davenport divided the neck between his two sons, Newberry Davenport, Sr. and Lawrence Davenport. Lawrence erected a house on his section in 1816, later known as Davenport Grange and the old Lispenard–Rodman House became the house of Newberry, Jr. This began a process whereby both branches of the family sold large plots of acreage to wealthy persons who established handsome homes and estates on the neck. About this time, Newberry Davenport, Jr. would have added the kitchen wing to the old house, continuing the stone fabric and gable roof of the main house. The grade level of the land around the house may have begun to be heightened at this time as access to the original basement kitchen was closed-off. There is no other evidence of the house changing significantly at this time.

Newberry Dayenport, Jr. died in 1863, leaving his house and remaining estate to his two unmarried children, Lawrence Montgomery Davenport and Anna Davenport. Based on the financial successes of their predecessors, the later Davenports enjoyed a comfortable leisurely lifestyle, traveling to Europe, providing community services and participating in the sophisticated social circle that had enveloped around the prominent estates built in the neck. Lawrence M. Davenport had Alexander Jackson Davis design the neighboring San Souci. By 1865, he had sold it to Mrs. Anthony Walton White Evans, who hired Davis to design additions in 1871. The Davenports continued to sell property to the growing number of people searching for country seats on Long Island Sound.

Sometime after Newberry Davenport's demise the house was dramatically altered to conform to more of an estate taste with the addition of a gambrel-roofed second floor, porches and interior changes. The roof top ventilator was a functional part introducing the then modern idea of healthful living into the venerable structure. The principal (sound-side) rooms on the interior were embellished with new trim in a restrained manner. Windows were extended to floor level on the piazza and most sash were replaced with casements with an unusually configured muntin pattern. The rear and kitchen rooms remained essentially unaltered in the transformation. The property had been reduced in size to only a few acres as a result of the sale of waterfront lots immediately before the house to Adrian Iselin, a New York financier, and Clarksen N. Potter, former Congressman. The land level may have been further built up at this time and driveways rerouted.

When Anna Davenport died in 1913, Adrian Iselin's daughter Georgine acquired the property and lived there occasionally for the next thirty years. Colonial Revival-style paneling and trim in the parlor and hall were added during her occupancy. With her residence, the house ceased to evolve and became a local historic relic.

Louis Ferguson, English professor at Adelphi University and a dedicated local historian, purchased the Lispenard–Rodman–Davenport House in 1964 and conducted extensive research on the property. Subsequently, he undertook an extensive, multi-year restoration project which uncovered original structural elements, such as hand-hewn beams of its frame and the lime mortar made from local oyster shells used to cement the house's stone walls. Ferguson led the effort to have the property officially recognized as a historic landmark. In 1986, it was listed on the National Register of Historic Places.

== Site detail ==
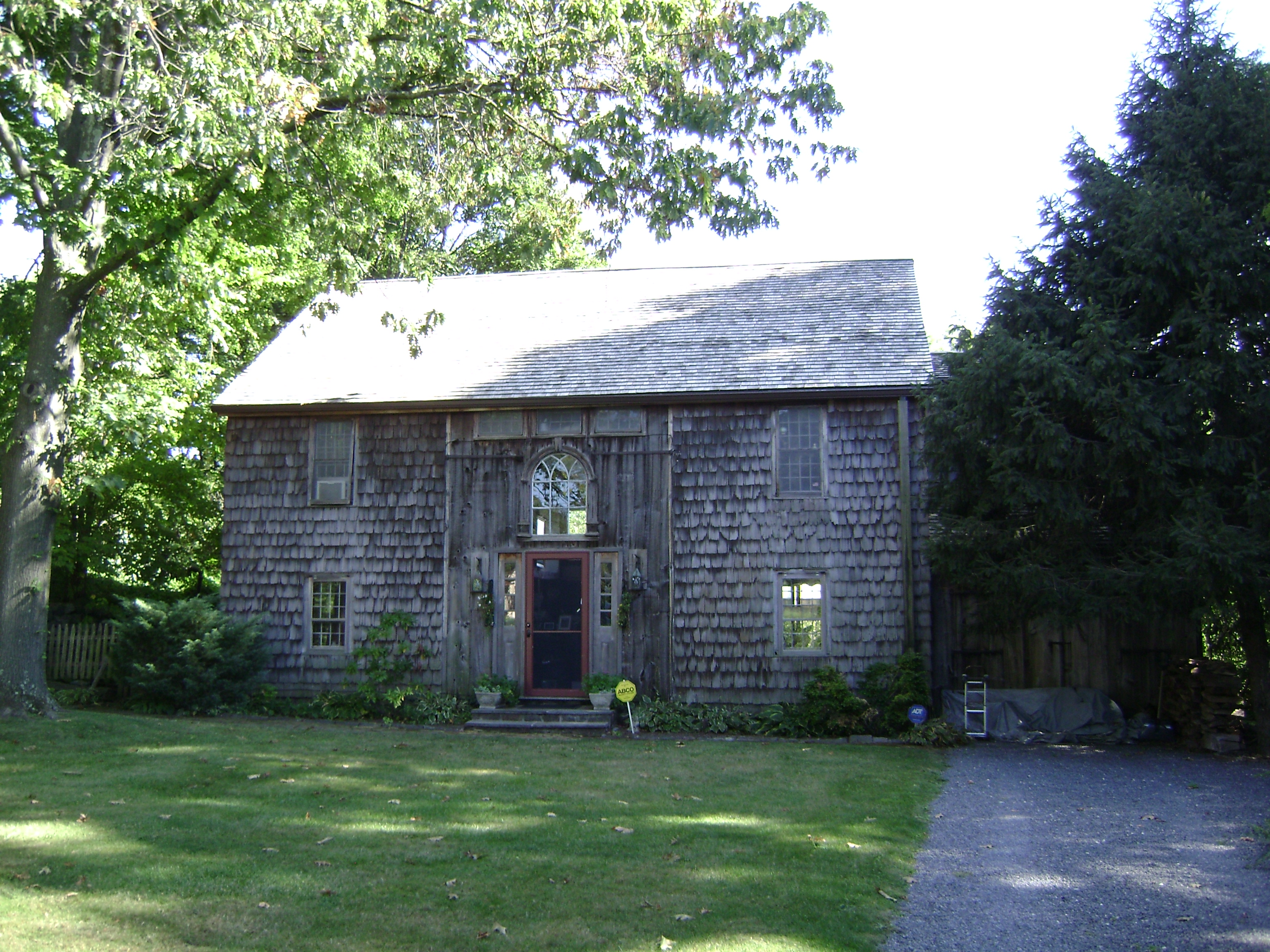
Residence in 2014

The house stands slightly in the western edge of what would have been the highest rise of ground of Davenport Neck, formerly known as Leisler's or Le Compte's Neck. Long Island Sound, roughly 150 yards to the east, was one of its sea views. To the west, the Lispenard mill, built shortly after the house, stood at the end of what is now called Titus Mill Pond and still separates the neck from mainland. Half of this original pond was filled in, for the creation of athletic fields and a causeway across the Mill Pond in the early 1950s. The small promontory on which the house is sited may have been created with earthen fill in the nineteenth century. Lawns, distinguished by mature plantings, extend to the boundaries. Dry laid stone retaining walls create terraces west and south of the house. An early well house remains east of the house near an 1800s kitchen wing that contributes to the significance of the property. In 1968, a 1750s frame barn was moved from a neighboring Rodman family property to a site west of the house and has been adapted for use as a residence.

== Significance ==
The Lispenard–Rodman–Davenport House is architecturally significant as the physical manifestation of the two-hundred-year evolution of an important regional house form and a residence of three families prominent in the history of New Rochelle. At each of its three major architectural stages, the house embodies distinctive characteristics of its type, period and method of construction. The house evolved from a pioneer stone structure built by a Huguenot close to the end of the seventeenth century to a mid-eighteenth century southern New York Dutch vernacular farmhouse type, and finally to a Victorian period suburban country seat inspired by a romantic Picturesque taste. These stages of development reflect the changing lifestyles and design taste in New Rochelle as it grew from a coastal settlement to a maritime center and residential satellite of New York City and convey a sense of the area's history over two centuries.

Additional significance is derived from the association of occupants of the house with the history of Davenport Neck. The Lispenard family was part of the group of Huguenot refugees who established New Rochelle in the late seventeenth century. Antoine Lispenard, the builder of the initial house, was the son of an important emissary of the English colonial government. He erected a dam between Davenport Neck and the mainland and established the first grist mill in New Rochelle. The property was sold to Joseph Rodman, two of whose children had married into the Lispenard family. Rodman further developed the milling business and was a member of the growing Quaker community that was expanding along the Sound and contributing to the industrial and mercantile sophistication of the area. However, the occupants with the longest tenure and most dramatic impact on the property were the Davenports. Within the 129 years of their ownership, the farmhouse was completely transformed into an elegant country seat and the farm was subdivided into independent waterfront estates owned by Davenport descendants and others. The Davenports participated in local commerce and government and were agents in the change experienced in the growing nineteenth century community.

== See also ==
- Crystal Lake (New Rochelle, New York)
