= Titus Mill-Pond & New York State Tidal Wetlands =

Wetlands in New Rochelle, New York

Coordinates: 40.900°N 73.776°W

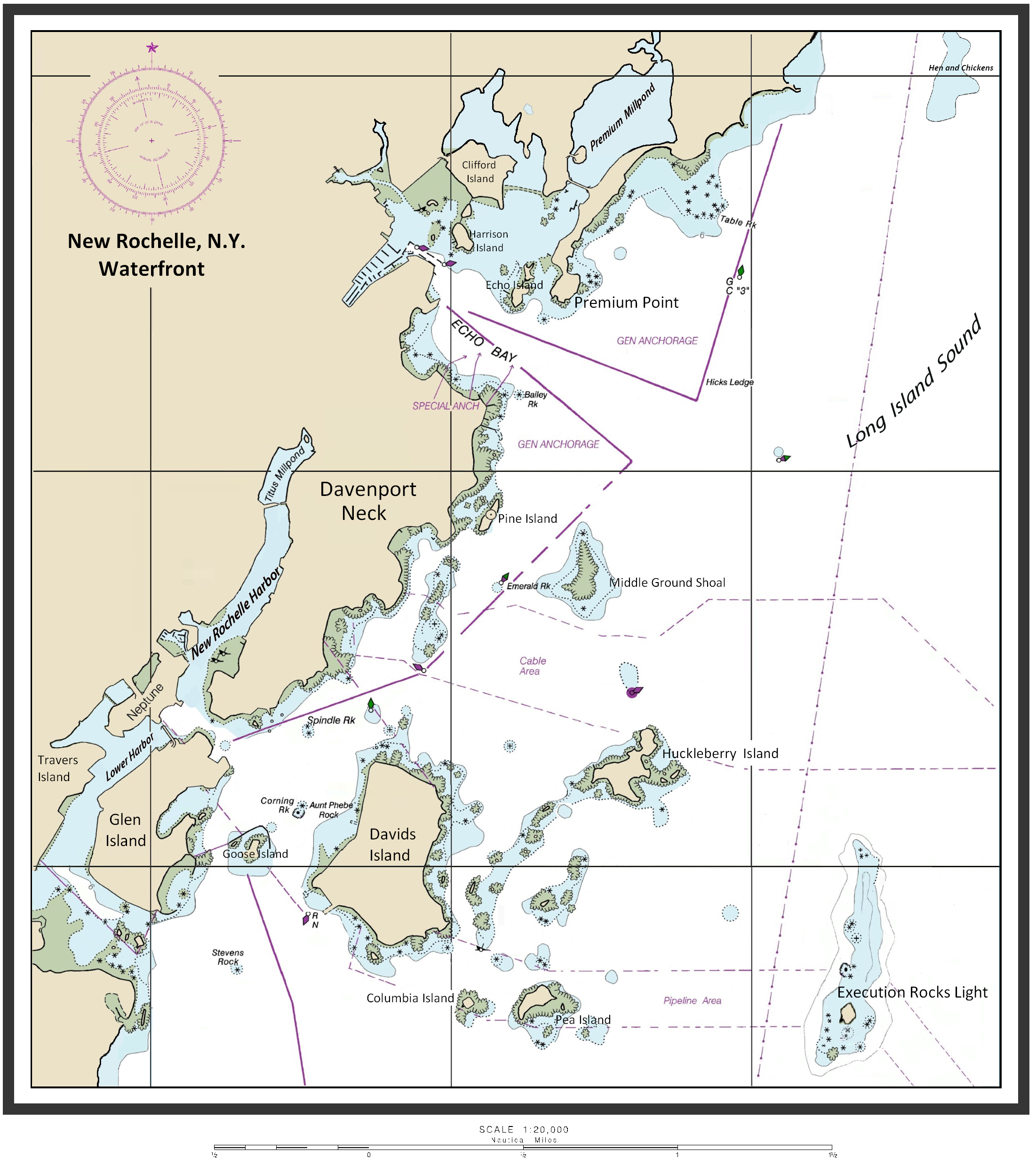
Titus Mill Pond, Davenport Neck and Harbor Management Area

Titus Mill Pond & New York State Tidal Wetlands is located at the northeastern end of New Rochelle Harbor in the city of New Rochelle in Westchester, New York. The waters in the harbor and pond flow from Long Island Sound, with tides up to eight feet in the inlet and with no fresh water stream entering into it.

== History ==
Titus Mill Pond was the former site of the Lispenard Mill. In 1708 Antoine Lispenard bought from Jacob Leisler's son a half interest in the peninsula between New Rochelle Harbor and Long Island Sound. Six years later he bought the other half. Across the inlet he built a dam and a tidal grist mill . Each incoming tide filled a mill-pond behind the dam, and then, as the tide ebbed, the water was released through a millrace to turn the mill wheel. Nearby the mill-pond, on the neck itself, Lispenard built his home, a stone house of one-and-a-half stories, with the front eaves extending to form the roof of a wide porch. The Lispenard family was part of the group of Huguenot refugees who established New Rochelle in the late seventeenth century. Antoine Lispenard was the son of an important emissary of the English colonial government.

Lispenard died in 1758, but the mill continued to be operated by his son, David Lispenard, and son-in-law, Jacobus Bleecker. In 1797 it was purchased by Samuel Titus, who owned and operated it for about forty years. Eventually it became unprofitable, due largely to the effects of the opening of the Erie Canal and the rapid development of the milling industry in western New York, and it was finally torn down near the end of the nineteenth century.

== Tidal Wetlands ==
The Titus Mill Pond State Tidal Wetlands are a protected natural resource area subject to the jurisdiction of the New York State Department of Environmental Conservation (NYSDEC). They are situated at the eastern edge of the pond, where the Davenport Neck peninsula connects to the mainland, and are classified as a "formerly connected tidal wetlands zone in which normal tidal flow is restricted by man-made causes", or in this instance, the Lispenard-Titus grist-mill and dam.

The Titus Mill Pond wetland area is an intertidal marsh (IM) consisting of a vegetated, tidal wetland zone lying between the average high and low tidal elevation of New Rochelle Harbor and the Titus Mill Pond. The predominant vegetation here is low marsh cordgrass, Spartina alterniflora. The water in the wetlands is saltwater from Long Island Sound. IM areas are the most biologically productive of all wetlands categories, and have high values for flood and sediment control. Even small patches of IM wetland are considered by the NYSDEC to be of critical importance.
