= Theodore C. Marceau =

American photographer (1859–1922)

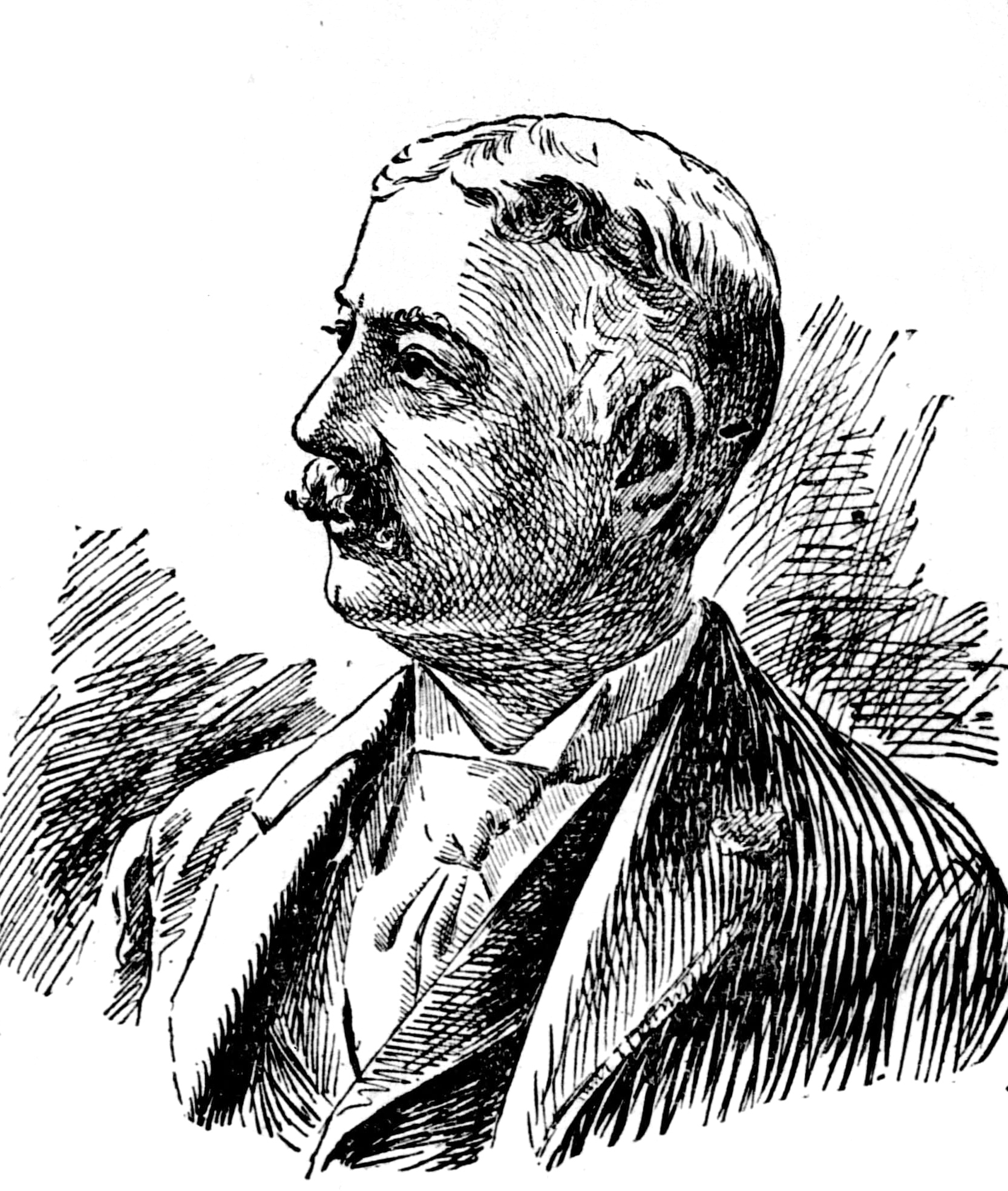
Theodore C. Marceau

Theodore Christopher Marceau (May 28, 1859 – June 22, 1922) was an American photographer. He worked for the United States federal government, photographing the 1882 transit of Venus in Chile, and for the states of Ohio and California, before establishing his own studio in Cincinnati. He relocated to New York City in 1900.

Marceau died of a heart attack in 1922 at his home in Premium Point, New Rochelle, New York. His studio was inherited by his son Theodore Jr., who sold it shortly afterward.
