= Westchester Mountain, Nova Scotia =

Community in Nova Scotia, Canada

Coordinates: 45°34′21″N 63°43′22″W

Westchester Mountain in Nova Scotia

Westchester Mountain is a community in the Canadian province of Nova Scotia, located in Cumberland County.
