= Premium Plaza, Ndola =

Residential building in Zambia

Premium Plaza is the largest residential flats building in Zambia owned by the Zambia States Insurance Corporation (ZSIC). With 10 floors above the ground, the building is situated in Kansenshi, Ndola at the corner of Kwacha and Chela roads. The ground floor is a shopping complex with assorted shops and offices.

The building comprises 108 flats and 18 shops.

== Controversies ==
In May 2022, it was announced that the building is going on auction sale with a reserve price of ZMW 55 million. However, shortly after, this was met with resistance when the Save Premium Plaza Society, a group of sitting tenants at the property, petitioned Ndola Central Member of Parliament Frank Tayali, requesting President Hakainde Hichilema to stop ZSIC Life Limited from selling the property on the open market. The MP responded by advising ZSIC to halt the sale of the property.
