= Parkinson's Foundation =

US nonprofit organization

- Logo
- Founded: 1957; 69 years ago
- Founder: Jeanne C. Levey; William Black
- Tax ID no.: 13-1866796
- Legal status: 501(c)(3) Non-profit
- Purpose: Parkinson's disease research and resources
- Headquarters: Miami, Florida; New York City, New York
- Chairman: Paul H. Nathan
- Chief Executive Officer: John L. Lehr
- Chief Scientific Officer: James Beck, PhD
- Chief Medical Officer: Sneha Mantri, MD, MS
- Website: parkinson.org

The Parkinson's Foundation is a national organization in the USA that funds research and provides educational resources to Parkinson's disease patients and caregivers. The Parkinson's Foundation was established in 2016 through the merger of the National Parkinson Foundation and the Parkinson's Disease Foundation. The Parkinson's Foundation has headquarters in Miami and New York City, in addition to 18 chapters throughout the United States.

== History ==
=== 1957–1960s ===
The organizations that merged to create the Parkinson's Foundation in 2016 were both created in 1957. The National Parkinson Foundation was founded by Jeanne C. Levey in Miami and the Parkinson's Disease Foundation was founded by William Black in New York.

The founding organizations funded researchers such as Melvin Yahr and H. Houston Merritt.

In 1965, Parkinson's Foundation funding led to the establishment of the Columbia University Medical Center's basic science laboratories in the William Black Building.

In 1969, Yahr and Parkinson's Foundation colleagues published results of the first double-blind trial of levodopa.

=== 1970s–1980s ===
The Parkinson's Foundation began funding summer fellowships for medical students in the 1970s.

In 1971, Roger C. Duvoisin developed Columbia University's Rating Scale, the forerunner to the Unified Parkinson Disease Rating Scale. In the same year, the Parkinson's Foundation and Merck, Inc. funded Dr. Yahr's double-blind clinical trial of carbidopa/levodopa (Sinemet), which remains the gold standard therapy for Parkinson's disease.

In the 1980s, the Parkinson's Foundation began investing in movement disorder training fellowships at Columbia University and Rush University.

In 1985, the Parkinson's Foundation established its Centers of Excellence Network, which today consists of 51 designated medical centers worldwide that deliver care to more than 196,000 Parkinson's patients.

=== 1990s–2000s ===
With funding from the Parkinson's Foundation, Duvoisin and his team described the Contursi kindred, the first description of inherited Parkinson's, in 1990.

In 1994, the Parkinson's Foundation joined several other organizations to create a scientific research fundraiser, the Parkinson's Unity Walk.

In 2002, a research team at Columbia University funded by the Parkinson's Foundation found evidence that Parkinson's requires the alpha-synuclein protein, a now well-known hallmark of the disease.

=== 2010s–2020s ===
In 2011, the Parkinson's Foundation launched Moving Day, its signature fundraising walk for Parkinson's.

In 2019, the Parkinson's Foundation launched PD GENEration, a national initiative that offers genetic testing for clinically relevant Parkinson's-related genes and genetic counseling at no cost for Parkinson's patients.

In 2022, the Parkinson's Foundation partnered with Parkinson's UK to establish the Venture Philanthropy Fund, which invests money into Parkinson's disease research.

== Research ==
=== Clinical studies ===
==== Parkinson's Outcomes Project ====
The Parkinson's Outcomes Project was started in 2009 and as of 2022 remains the largest-ever clinical study of Parkinson's disease. The longitudinal study is executed through the Parkinson's Foundation Global Care Network and monitors the symptoms and quality of life of Parkinson's patients to determine best practices in healthcare and establish standard treatment protocols.

The Parkinson's Outcomes Project found that depression and anxiety are the number one factors impacting the overall health of Parkinson's patients. The study also found that increasing physical activity to at least 2.5 hours a week can slow decline in quality of life.

==== PD GENEration: Mapping the Future of Parkinson's Disease ====
PD GENEration: Mapping the Future of Parkinson's Disease is a national initiative that offers genetic testing for clinically relevant Parkinson's-related genes and genetic counseling at no cost for Parkinson's patients.

=== Venture Philanthropy Fund ===
In 2022, the Parkinson's Foundation established the Venture Philanthropy Fund. This fund advances Parkinson's disease research by investing money into the Parkinson's Virtual Biotech Fund, the drug development arm of Parkinson's UK.

== Affiliations ==
=== Global Care Network ===
The Parkinson's Foundation Global Care Network is a healthcare network that provides care to Parkinson's patients. The network is composed of Centers of Excellence and Comprehensive Care Centers.

A Parkinson's Foundation Center of Excellence is a medical center with a specialized team of neurologists, movement disorder specialists, physical therapists, occupational therapists, mental health professionals and others who are up to date on the latest Parkinson's medications, therapies and research. The Foundation has designated 60 medical centers around the world as part of its Global Care Network.

Parkinson's Foundation Comprehensive Care Centers are medical facilities with multi-disciplinary teams providing Parkinson's care. Each center is required to meet care, professional training, community education and outreach criteria.

The Parkinson's Foundation is affiliated with the following institutions:

Country	Medical Institutions
Australia	Victorian Comprehensive Parkinson's Program
Canada	McGill University Parkinson Program Pacific Parkinson's Research Centre, University of British Columbia Toronto Western Hospital Movement Disorders Center University of Alberta
Germany	Phillips University
Israel	Tel Aviv Sourasky Medical Center
Italy (Fresco Network)	Moriggia-Pelascini Hospital Policlinico of Milan San Martino Hospital Santa Chiara Hospital Santa Maria della Misericordia Hospital (Grosseto) Villa Margherita
Netherlands	Nijmegen Parkinson Center
Singapore	Singapore National Neuroscience Institute
Taiwan	National Taiwan University Hospital, Center for Parkinson & Movement Disorders
United Kingdom	Derby Hospitals NHS Foundation Trust and University of Nottingham Kings College Hospital
United States	Barrow Neurological Institute Baylor College of Medicine Beth Israel Deaconess Medical Center Cleveland Clinic Center for Neurological Restoration Cleveland Clinic Lou Ruvo Center for Brain Health Columbia University Irving Medical Center Corewell Health Dartmouth Hitchcock Medical Center Duke Health Movement Disorders Center Emory University Froedtert & the Medical College of Wisconsin Neuroscience Institute Hartford HealthCare Indiana University School of Medicine Jefferson Health's Comprehensive Parkinson's Disease & Movement Disorder Center Johns Hopkins Parkinson's Disease & Movement Disorders Center Keck School of Medicine of USC Marlene and Paolo Fresco Institute for Parkinson's and Movement Disorders at NYU Langone Medical Center Massachusetts General Hospital Medical University of South Carolina Medstar Georgetown University Hospital Mount Sinai Beth Israel Northwestern University Movement Disorders Center Ochsner Neuroscience Institute Ohio State University Wexner Medical Center, Center for Parkinson’s Disease and Other Movement Disorders Oregon Health & Science University Parkinson Center Rush University Medical Center Spectrum Health Stanford Movement Disorders Center Struthers Parkinson's Center The Queen's Medical Center UNC School of Medicine University of Arkansas for Medical Sciences University of California, San Diego Movement Disorder Center University of California, San Francisco University of Colorado Movement Disorders Center University of Florida Center for Movement Disorders and Neurorestoration University of Iowa University of Kansas Medical Center University of Miami Leonard M. Miller School of Medicine University of Michigan Health University of Pennsylvania Movement Disorder Center University of Rochester Medical Center University of South Florida Parkinson's Disease and Movement Disorders Center Medical College of Georgia, Augusta University University of Tennessee Medical Center U of Texas Health Science Center, San Antonio University of Utah Vanderbilt University Medical Center Virginia Commonwealth University

=== Research centers ===
The Parkinson's Foundation has designated five institutions as research centers: Columbia University Medical Center, the University of Florida in collaboration with Emory University, the Icahn School of Medicine at Mount Sinai, the University of Michigan in collaboration with the University of Texas Southwestern Medical Center, and the Yale School of Medicine. These institutions receive $2 million in Parkinson's Foundation funding over four years to further research that advances the understanding and treatment of Parkinson's.

== Grants and awards ==
Since 1957, the Parkinson's Foundation has invested more than $474 million in Parkinson's disease research and clinical care.

=== Awards for institutions ===
The Parkinson's Foundation Research Center designation provides funding for team science at institutions working on a thematic area of Parkinson's disease.

The Institutional Movement Disorders Fellowship provides an institution with the funds to support the two-year long training of an incoming movement disorders fellow.

=== Awards for independent investigators ===
George G. Kaufman Impact Awards fund projects that are in need of support to impact the Parkinson's community.

Stanley Fahn Junior Faculty Awards provide funding to early career scientists to further their Parkinson's disease research.

Conference Awards support the gathering of experts working to address unsolved clinical or basic science problems relevant to Parkinson's disease.

=== Fellowships and early career awards ===
The Launch Award is an award for postdoctoral researchers who are transitioning to independent research careers in Parkinson's.

Postdoctoral Fellowships are two-year fellowships for scientists who have recently completed their Ph.D. training or neurology residencies.

Visiting Scholar Awards support the travel and housing of scholars while visiting host laboratories that conduct Parkinson's research.

Summer Student Fellowships provide students interested in Parkinson's disease with an opportunity to conduct research through 10 weeks of clinical or laboratory work.

The Melvin Yahr Early Career Award in Movement Disorders Research supports neurologists after residency.

Partnership Awards are collaborative partnerships supporting clinician-scientist training, patient-oriented Parkinson's research and medical student Parkinson's studies.

The Nurse Faculty Award is seed grant funding intended to support Edmond J. Safra Visiting Nurse Scholars.

The Physical Therapy Faculty Award is seed grant funding intended to support Physical Therapy Faculty alumni.

== Advocacy ==
The Parkinson's Foundation partners with The Michael J. Fox Foundation to host the Parkinson's Policy Forum. The event brings together community members and researchers for research updates, policy briefings, advocacy trainings and networking opportunities.

The People with Parkinson's Advisory Council is a patient leadership group. The council was created in 2006 and is composed of people with Parkinson's disease and caregivers who serve as advisors to the foundation.

The Parkinson's Foundation Research Advocates program trains Parkinson's patients and their caregivers to collaborate with Parkinson's disease scientists in research. The program was established in 2008 and has trained more than 350 participants.

== Programs and services ==
=== Helpline ===
The Parkinson's Foundation Helpline is staffed by nurses, social workers and health educators. PD Conversations is an online support network that allows individuals to ask experts Parkinson's questions.

=== Newly Diagnosed ===
The Newly Diagnosed Kit includes information and resources for individuals who have recently been diagnosed with Parkinson's disease.

=== Hospital Safety Guide ===
The Hospital Safety Guide provides information and resources to help Parkinson's patients stay safe during hospital visits.

=== Virtual Education Programming ===
==== Care Partner Program ====
The series of online courses provides Parkinson's caregivers with information and tools to help care for someone living with Parkinson's disease.

==== Expert Briefings Webinars ====
The webinars highlight the latest Parkinson's disease research and updates from experts in the field.

==== PD Health @ Home ====
The virtual educational and wellness program hosts weekly online events that provide at-home resources to Parkinson's patients and caregivers. Events include Mindfulness Mondays, Wellness Wednesdays and Fitness Fridays.

==== Substantial Matters: Life and Science of Parkinson's ====
The podcast series, hosted by Dan Keller, PhD, interviews Parkinson's experts to highlight treatments and techniques for living with Parkinson's disease, as well as research updates in the field.

=== Spanish-Language Resources ===
The Parkinson’s Foundation offers dedicated Spanish‑language resources that include educational materials, Helpline access, webinars, and other tools for Spanish-speaking members of the Parkinson’s disease community.

=== Community Grant Program ===
The grants support education and outreach programs that address unmet needs in the Parkinson's community. Since 2011, the Parkinson's Foundation has invested more than $12.7 million in community-based programs.

== Community events ==
=== Moving Day ===
Moving Day, a Walk for Parkinson's, is the main fundraising event for the Parkinson's Foundation. Moving Day was started in 2011 and hosts events in cities across the United States. The walk has raised over $50 million to advance Parkinson's disease research and improve care.

=== Parkinson's Champions ===
Parkinson's Champions is a community fundraising and endurance program. Individuals plan their own events or participate in endurance races to raise funds and awareness for Parkinson's disease. The program has raised nearly $12 million.

=== Parkinson's Revolution ===
Revolution is an annual indoor cycling event that raises funds to generate awareness and advance the mission of the Parkinson's Foundation. Revolution was started in 2020 and events take place in cities across the United States. The cycling event has raised over $2 million to advance Parkinson's disease research and improve care.

== Key people ==
John L. Lehr has been the chief executive officer since 2017. Paul H. Nathan serves as the chair of the Foundation's board of directors.

== Mergers, acquisitions, and partnerships ==
In August 2016, PDF and NPF merged to form the Parkinson's Foundation.

In October 2017, the Parkinson's Foundation acquired the Melvin Yahr International Parkinson's Disease Foundation.

In January 2020, the Parkinson's Foundation partnered with Zelira Therapeutics to study the benefits of medical cannabis in PD patients.

In May 2020, the Parkinson's Foundation partnered with the U.S. Department of Veteran Affairs to increase access to information about Parkinson's disease. Veterans who develop Parkinson's disease can be associated with exposure to Agent Orange or other herbicides during military service.
