= Davenport Neck =

Peninsula in New York

Coordinates: 40.899°N 73.771°W

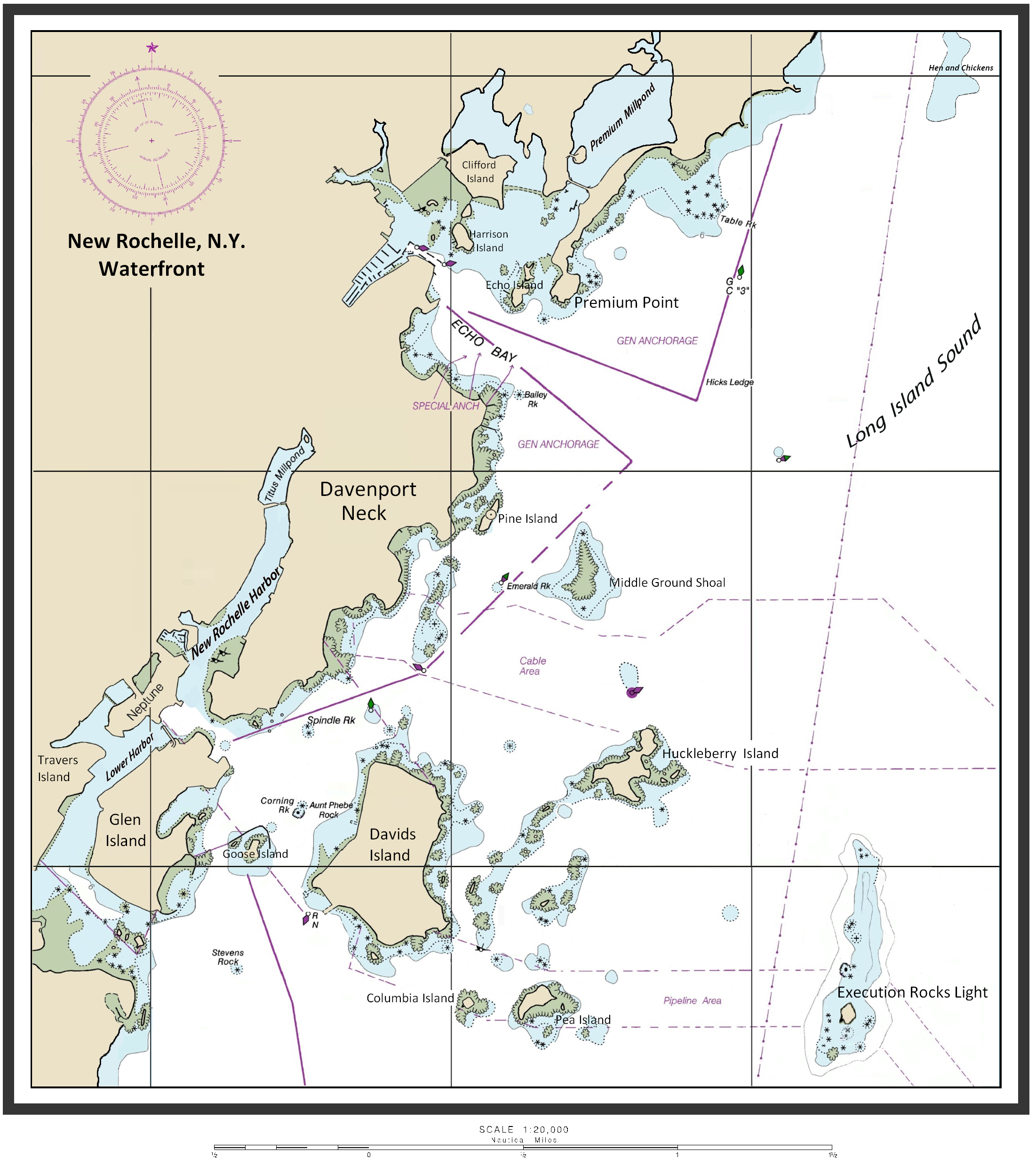
Davenport Neck and Harbor Management Area

Davenport Neck is a peninsula in New Rochelle, New York, extending southwesterly from the mainland into Long Island Sound, and running parallel to the main shore. It divides the city's waterfront into two, with New Rochelle Harbor to the south and southwest, and Echo Bay, to the north and northeast. Glen Island and Neptune Island lie just to the west of the Neck, and Davids and Huckleberry islands lie to the south.

The Neck is one of the most important historical localities in the City of New Rochelle. Before white settlements, Siwanoy Indians encamped here, finding an abundant source of fish and wildlife. Until the early 19th century tidal mills produced flour and other goods for local use and for export. With the advent of steamboat, and the resorts and inns that sprang up along the waterfront as a result, New Rochelle became an enormously popular destination by the mid-1800s. Davenport Neck was the choice location for the "summer homes" of wealthy vacationers.

== History ==
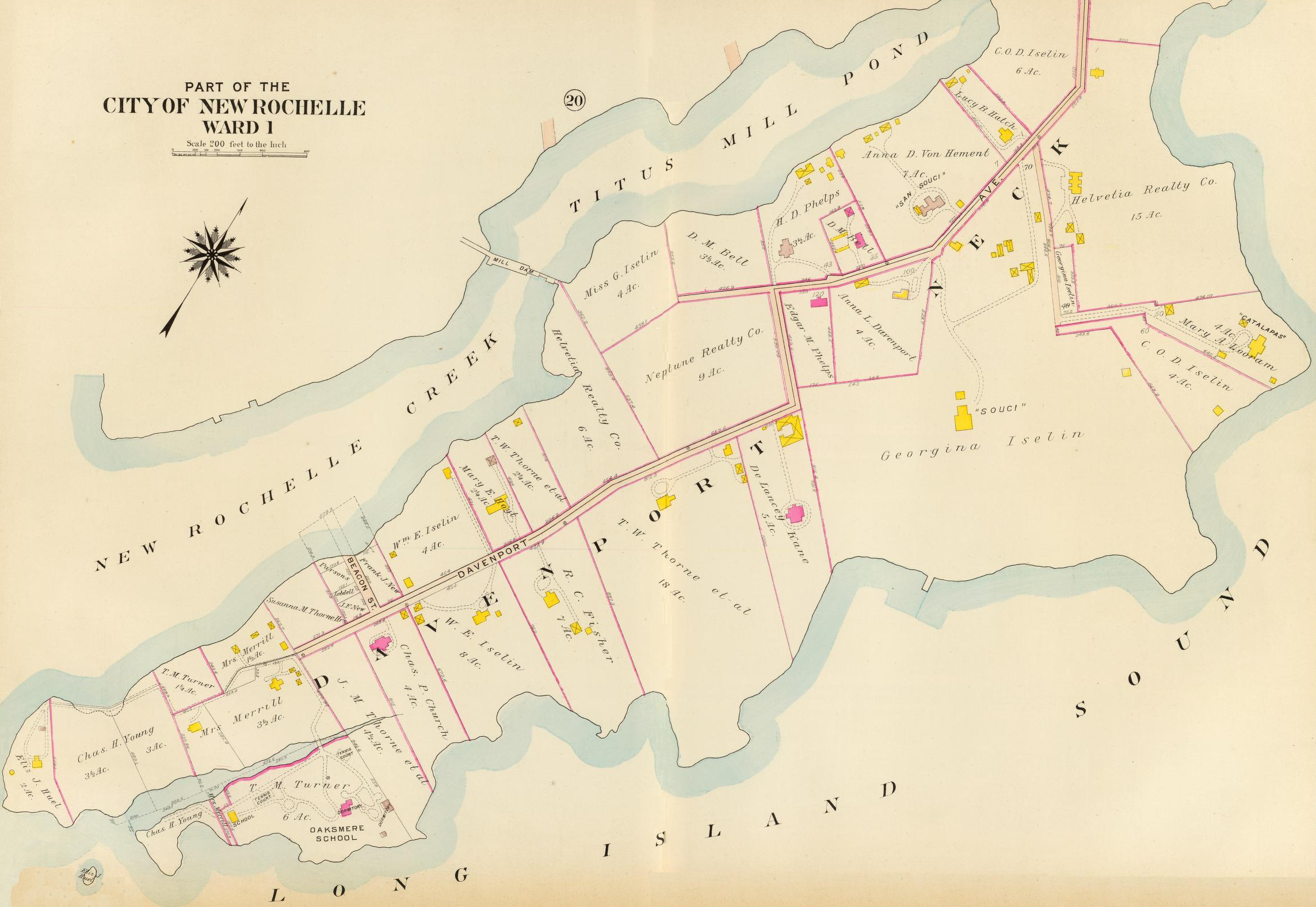

=== Indian villages ===
It was on the southeast and south shores of this neck that the principal Indian settlements within the limits of New Rochelle were located, primarily on the southerly side of the Neck extending from the cove at the southerly corner of Davenport Park, westerly along the shore. The largest number of stone objects of Indian manufacture collected within the City have been found here, many of them of very fine workmanship, attesting the superior culture of those who inhabited these villages. It is along the shores of Davenport Neck that the greatest number of the specimens in the Indian collection at the headquarters of the Huguenot Historical Association in the Paine Cottage were found. The presence here of articles made from material foreign to the region, in some instances coming from as far away as the Ohio Valley, shows extensive trade relations with other tribes in the West. Such objects include arrowheads, grooved and axes, stone mortars, drills, knives and scrapers.

Other similar villages were on the shores of the small creek between the two westerly points of the Neck. Indians visited the sheltered cove and small creek at the west end of the Neck until after the Huguenots had settled the town. Early residents such as Mary Le Counte who died in 1841 at the age of 105 years, had vivid recollections of the Indian villages and their wigwams. It is likely that upon the coming of Europeans to these shores, they found a large part of the neck adjacent to the Indian village sites under cultivation by the Indians, making the locality especially attractive as a place to settle.

=== Early Europeans ===
As early as the year 1665, Thomas Mullinax, then a resident of the Town of Westchester, in utter disregard of the purchase that Thomas Pell had made from the Indians in 1654 covering all the later Manor of Pelham, applied to Governor Richard Nicolls for a patent for this neck, which was duly granted to him. Due to the remonstrances of Pell, the Governor subsequently revoked the patent because it was obtained by misinformation. Pell got his patent from Governor Nicolls in October, 1666.

The next proprietors were a group of Huguenot settlers who purchased the neck prior to the purchase of the entire town made under the contract between Pell and Jacob Leisler in 1687. However, Leisler also participated in the earlier project, and with the six other purchasers, Jean Bouteillier, Andre Thauvet, Etienne Lumprey, Isaac Broussard Des Champs, Daniel Streing and M. Paquinett, immediately divided the entire neck among themselves into small home lots running from six to forty two acres, Leisler having the largest share.

=== Huguenot settlement ===
The influx of Huguenot refugees to New York City, following the revocation of the Edict of Nantes, soon made it clear that the projected settlement must be expanded to accommodate many other Huguenots and requiring much more land than was available on the narrow limits of the neck, so a contract to purchase six thousand acres, including the neck, and the balance on the mainland was entered into on July 2, 1687. The several lots on the neck were later bought up by Jacob Leisler and Guillaume LeConte. The neck was first called "Pell's Little Neck," to distinguish it from his larger neck located three miles closer to New York City. After Leisler and Le Conte became the joint owners of the entire neck, it was called "Leisler's and Le Conte's Neck", a name that was retained as late as 1710. Le Conte appears to have taken up his residence on the neck, and the northeasterly promontory, now known as Hudson Park, was known as early as 1703 as "Bonnefoy Point", being named from David Bonnefoy, LeConte's brother-in-law.

In 1708, Jacob Leisler, Jr., who had inherited his father's property, sold his share of the neck to Anthony Lispenard, then a resident of New York City, and, six years later, in 1714, Le Conte's son and daughter sold the share that their father had owned on the neck and which they had inherited, also to Lispenard. Lispenard had already taken up his residence on the neck and he continued to be its owner until the year 1732. In the interval, in 1724, he erected mills and a mill dam between the neck and the main shore. Lispenard sold the neck to Joseph Rodman of Flushing, Long Island, a Quaker, but retained the mills with dam and pond. It is not clear that "Lispenard'" became the fixed name of the neck, but, for a long period of years after 1732, it was known as "Rodman". Lispenard erected a house for himself on the neck, to which his successor Rodman made several enlargements. Joseph Rodman died in 1759, and his grandson of the same name succeeded to the ownership of the neck, and the latter, becoming involved in financial difficulties, sold it to John R. Myer, just previous to the outbreak of the Revolutionary War. From him it became known as "Myer's Point."

=== Davenport family ===
On the 22nd of October, 1776, General Knyphausen landed here with the 2nd Division of Hessians and the Regiment of Waldeckers, and moved forward to join General Howe's army encamped in New Rochelle, before the Battle of White Plains. After the war, in 1784, John R. Myer sold the neck to Newberry Davenport from whom the neck derives its current name. Davenport later acquired the rights of Hewlett, and, from time to time, until 1820, bought up the small parcels of salt meadow of one to five acres on the neck that had been owned by a number of the early settlers of the town as common lands appurtenant to their several farms on the mainland.

In the year 1813, during the Second War with Great Britain, guards of militia were stationed on the neck to prevent a landing of British from the British blockading squadron that was stationed in the Sound. In September, 1813, this squadron moved down to a point opposite New Rochelle and engaged a flotilla of gunboats that came up from the direction of New York City. This affair created much alarm in New Rochelle.

In 1814, Davenport divided the neck between his two sons, Newberry Davenport, Jr., and Lawrence Davenport In 1816, Lawrence erected a house on the part given to him by his father. His house is the present Davenport Grange which remained in the family until 1929, when it was given to the City of New Rochelle for a public park. The old Rodman house eventually became the home of Newberry Davenport, Jr., and continued in his family until the death of his daughter, Miss Anna Davenport. The home, referred to as the Lispenard-Rodman-Davenport House, is the oldest standing residential structure in New Rochelle and is listed on the National Register of Historic Places. Long before this, both branches of the Davenport family sold off large plots of acreage to wealthy persons, who established handsome homes and estates on the neck. The promontory of Bonnefoy Point early came into use as a picnic grove, and a steamboat dock was built there. In 1886, it was old to the Town of New Rochelle for a public park, being given the name of "Hudson Park."

=== Estates ===
With the advent of the steamboat, and the resorts and inns that sprung up along the shore as a result, New Rochelle became an enormously popular waterfront destination by the middle of the 19th century. Davenport Neck was a choice location for the summer homes and estates of wealthy vacationers who liked the town so much they often stayed for good. The Iselin banking family built a number of estates with Long Island Sound views. The patriarch Adrian Iselin built the first of these homes, Souci, in 1858. This palatial 16 bedroom home sat on 50 acres of magnificent gardens and was later inherited by his daughter Georgina, and adjoining property was acquired for the summer homes of her brothers. All seven children of Adrian Senior and his wife Elenor eventually made their homes along the waterfront of Davenport Neck and nearby Premium Point. William Iselin's estate eventually became the Davenport Country Club. "Tocoran", the home of Emilie Iselin and her husband John G. Beresford, was next door and became the Riviera shore club which folded in 1980 and has since become the gated community of Malysana Lane homes. "The Paddocks", home of Elenor Iselin and her husband Col. Delancey Kane, became the Colony Club and was torn down to become the current Surf Club. Columbus Iselin's Davenport Neck home, "Maison Bleu", burned down in 1954.

The Iselin's left some property for neighbors, including "Nutwood", located next to the Souci estate, and owned by Clarkson Potter, four time representative to the United States Congress. Between Torcoran and The Paddocks was the Davenport Thorne estate, an 18-acre property which is now the City owned Davenport Park. When Lydia Davenport Thorne bequeathed a parcel of her family owned property to the city of New Rochelle in 1929 she stipulated that it be used for passive recreation only so as to preserve the tranquil aura of the Neck. In the decades following, most of the neighboring mansions and acres were sold off for residential developments, country clubs and marinas.

== Hudson Park ==
The early name of Hudson Park was Bonnefoy Point, and it referred to the entire promontory at the northeast end of Davenport Neck. Guillaume LeConte and Jacob Leisler together bought up the entire neck after the projected Huguenot settlement there on had been expanded by a purchase of a larger tract on the mainland. Le Conte had arrived in New York City in the spring of 1689 from the West Indies, to take charge of the property of his father-in law, Jacques Lasty. Upon making the joint purchase of the neck with Leisler, he took up his residence there, and, in 1703, made a division of the neck with Jacob Leisler, Jr., who had inherited his father's lands in New Rochelle. David Bonnefoy was his brother-in-law and this close relationship and association no doubt brought about the naming of the point from him, and this name for it dates from before 1703 and continued to be used until late in the nineteenth century.

As early as 1842, the point was being used for a picnic grove and continued to be so used for nearly half a century under various proprietors. The property came into the ownership of Alexander B. Hudson, from whom it came to be called "Hudson Grove." There had been proposals made before that time that the grove be purchased for use as a public park, but it was not until 1886 that the purchase was made. It was then sold to the Town of New Rochelle by Mr. Hudson for $38,000, and has since been known by the name of "Hudson Park."

The main attraction is a bathing beach which is open to all residents of the city. The park also has bathhouses, playgrounds, gazebos, greenhouses and a bandshell used for summertime concerts. The New Rochelle Municipal Marina and the New Rochelle Rowing Club are located next to the park along the north-eastern shoreline of the neck.

== Sites, landmarks and attractions ==
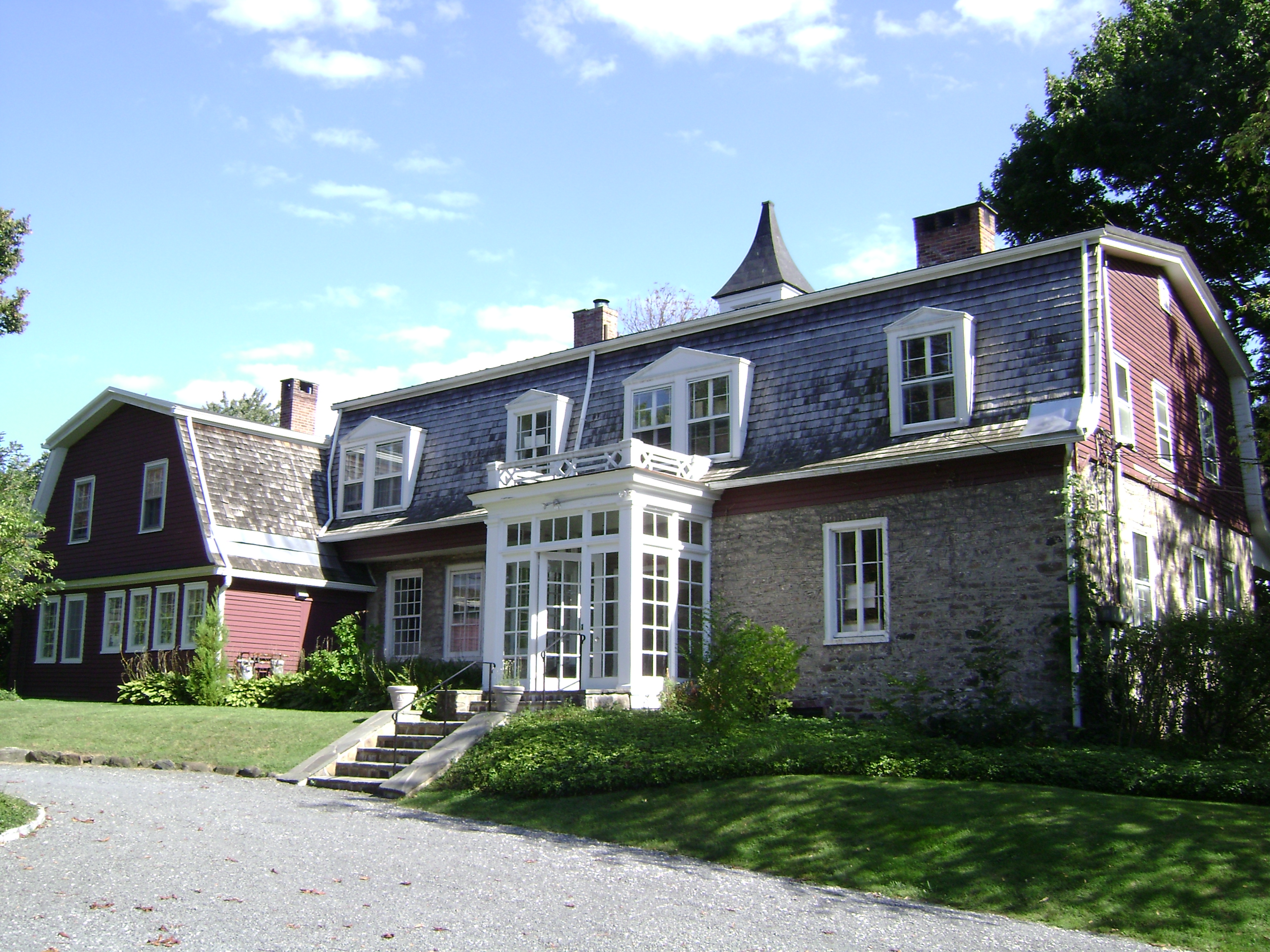
Lispenard-Rodman-Davenport House

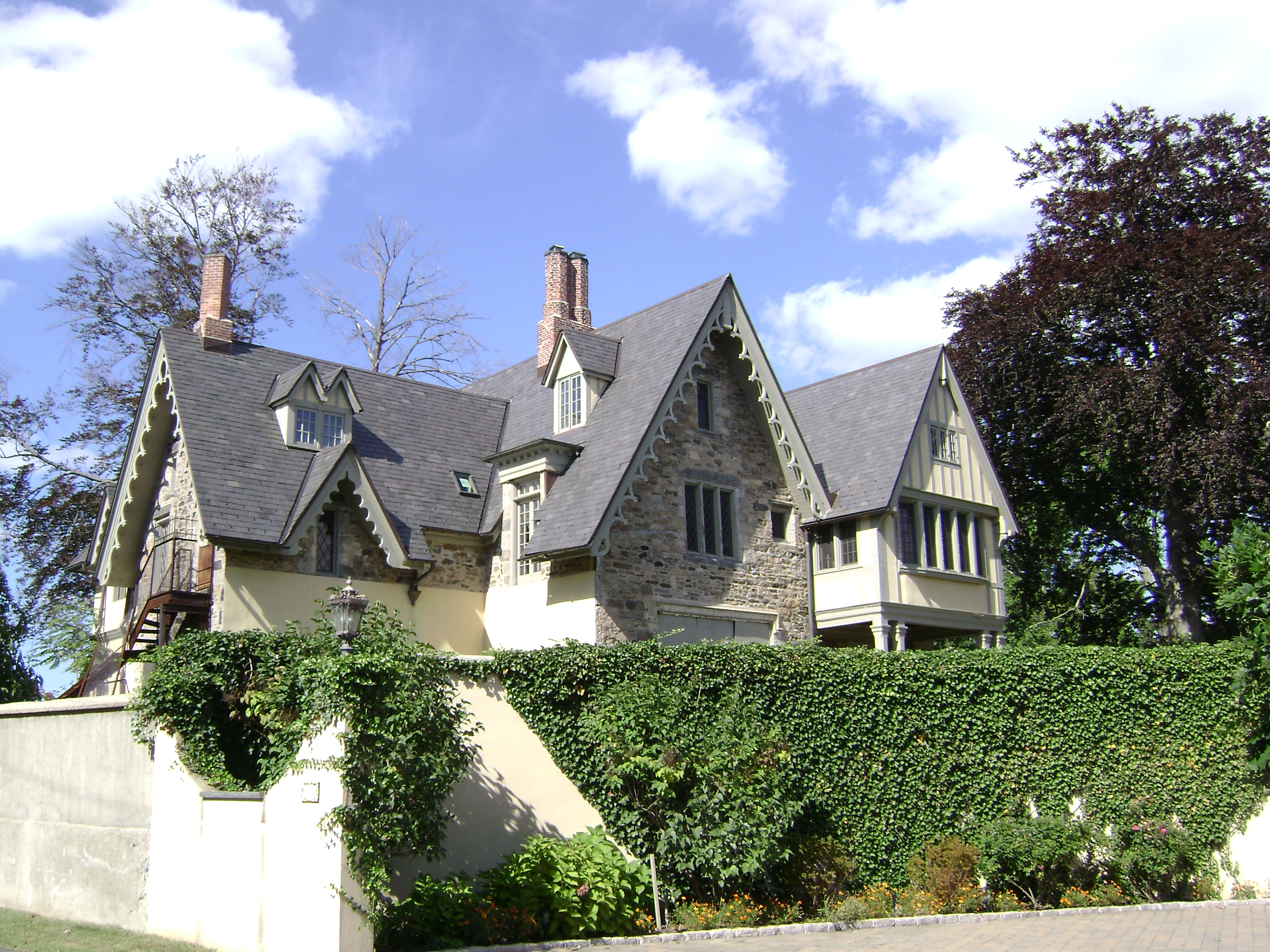
Wildcliff

Historic sites:

- Davenport House
- Lispenard-Rodman-Davenport House
- Wildcliff

Protected areas:

- Titus Mill-Pond & New York State Tidal Wetlands
- Davenport Bird Sanctuary

Parks and recreation:

- New Rochelle municipal marina
- New Rochelle Rowing Club
- Davenport Grange

Residential neighborhoods:

- Anchorage
- Brittany Estates
- Isle of Sans Souci
- Echo Manor
- Malysania Estates

Waterfront clubs:

- Neptune Yacht Club
- Imperial Yacht Club
- Greentree Country Club
- Davenport Country Club
- Beckwithe Pointe
- The Surf Club

== Geographic location ==
- U.S. Geological Survey Geographic Names Information System: Davenport Neck
- NY HomeTownLocator Community Profile
- As of this edit, this article uses content from "Davenport's Neck (New Rochelle, New York)", which is licensed in a way that permits reuse under the Creative Commons Attribution-ShareAlike 3.0 Unported License, but not under the GFDL. All relevant terms must be followed.
