= Premium Mill-Pond =

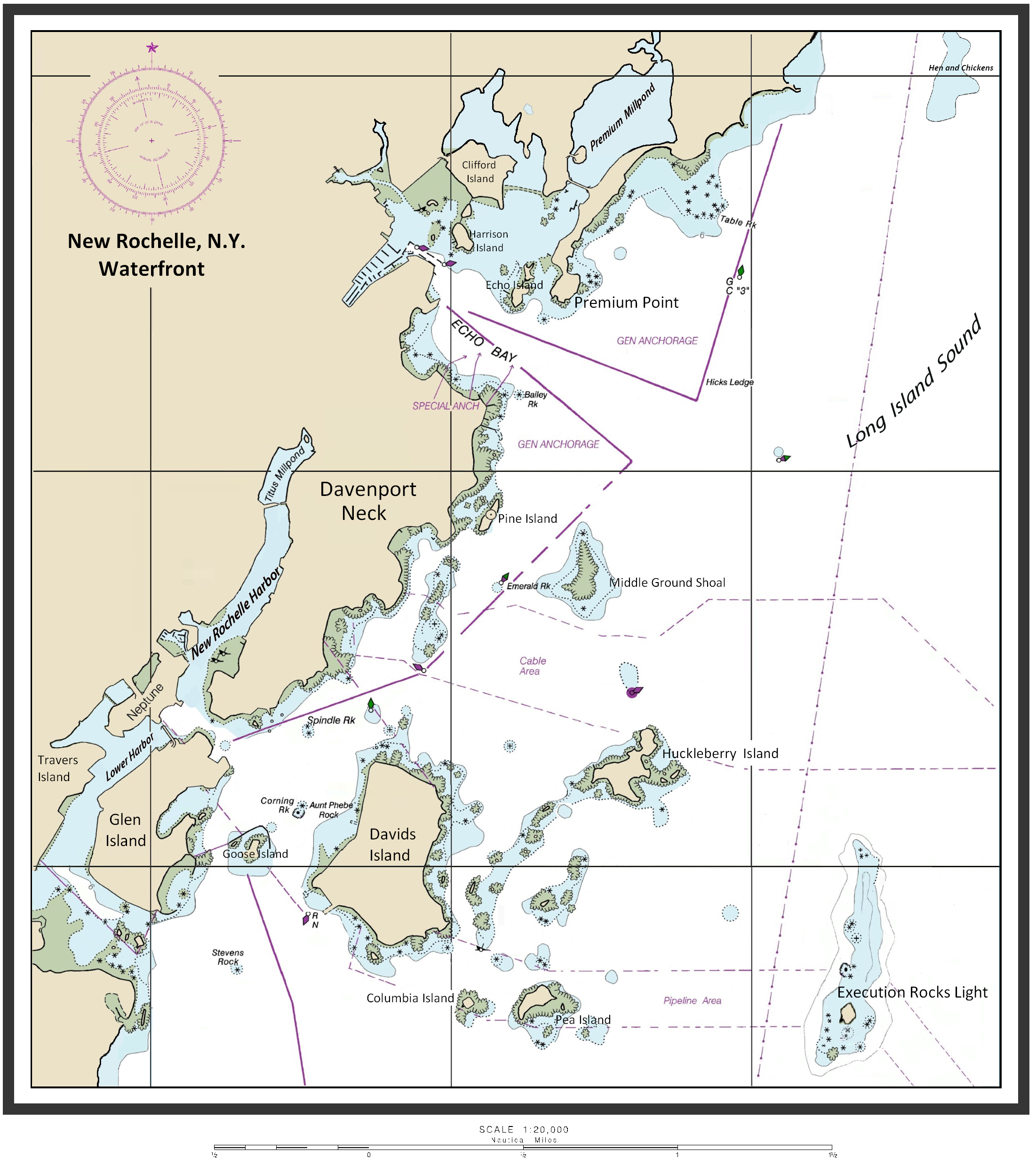

Premium Mill-Pond is located in the communities of New Rochelle and Mamaroneck in Westchester County, New York. The mill-pond is situated northeast of Echo Bay, between the Premium Point peninsula and the mainland. It is fed by the Premium River and is separated from Echo Bay by a dam that creates a waterfall into the harbor.

== Premium Mill ==
This mill was located on the border of New Rochelle and the Town of Mamaroneck on the Premium Point peninsula. It was the successor of a much older mill that had been located farther up the creek in the Town of Mamaroneck at Pryer's Bridge. The old mill on this creek originated, it would seem, with the Palmer family, probably Sylvanus Palmer, who died in 1742. His son, John Palmer, was the next owner, and he was followed by Gilbert Willett and then by Samuel Underhill. The latter sold it in 1776 to his brother-in-law, James Mott. The Palmers, Underhills, and Motts were Quakers.

James Mott continued to reside at and operate the old mill for over forty years, his home being the Pryer house, which he built, an older house having been burned. The Premium Mill was erected in 1801 by James Mott and his sons, who managed the mill business, and it was brought about by the need of greater facilities for handling the increasing business due to large exportation of flour to Europe following the French Revolution. The new mill was placed half a mile lower down near the mouth of the bay, whose tide provided the water power and gave much larger storage of water than the dam above at the old mill. The Premium Mill was very large with ten run of stones which was later increased to twelve and every known improvement was introduced. It was said to have been the largest flour-mill in the country at that period.

The wars between Napoleon and England in 1806 and 1807, and the embargoes and blockades placed on the ports, were disastrous to the Mott family business, and, following this, came The War of 1812 with even more disastrous results. After the close of the latter war, the property passed from the Motts to Isaac W. Coles and William F. Coles. Although the mill itself was at the Mamaroneck end of the mill-dam, the dam itself connected with the New Rochelle shore and the miller's house was at the New Rochelle end. However, access to and from the mill was over the old mill-dam at Pryer's to a land bridge connection present only at low tide, and then down the beach to its location at the peninsulas end. In 1829 a new road was built from the New Rochelle end of the dam to the Boston Post Road, creating a much-needed and more direct connection from the main road. The road still exists as the only access route to Premium Point.

The business of the mill never recovered from the effects of the wars, and, eventually, dwindled to insignificance, due largely to the construction of the Erie Canal and the development of western New York as the great center of the milling industry. Henry P. Kellogg became its owner in 1843 and held it for nearly forty years. The last use of the mill was for grinding barite minerals, after which it was abandoned to decay and was torn down January 1883.
