= Tommy Manville =

American heir and socialite (1894–1967)

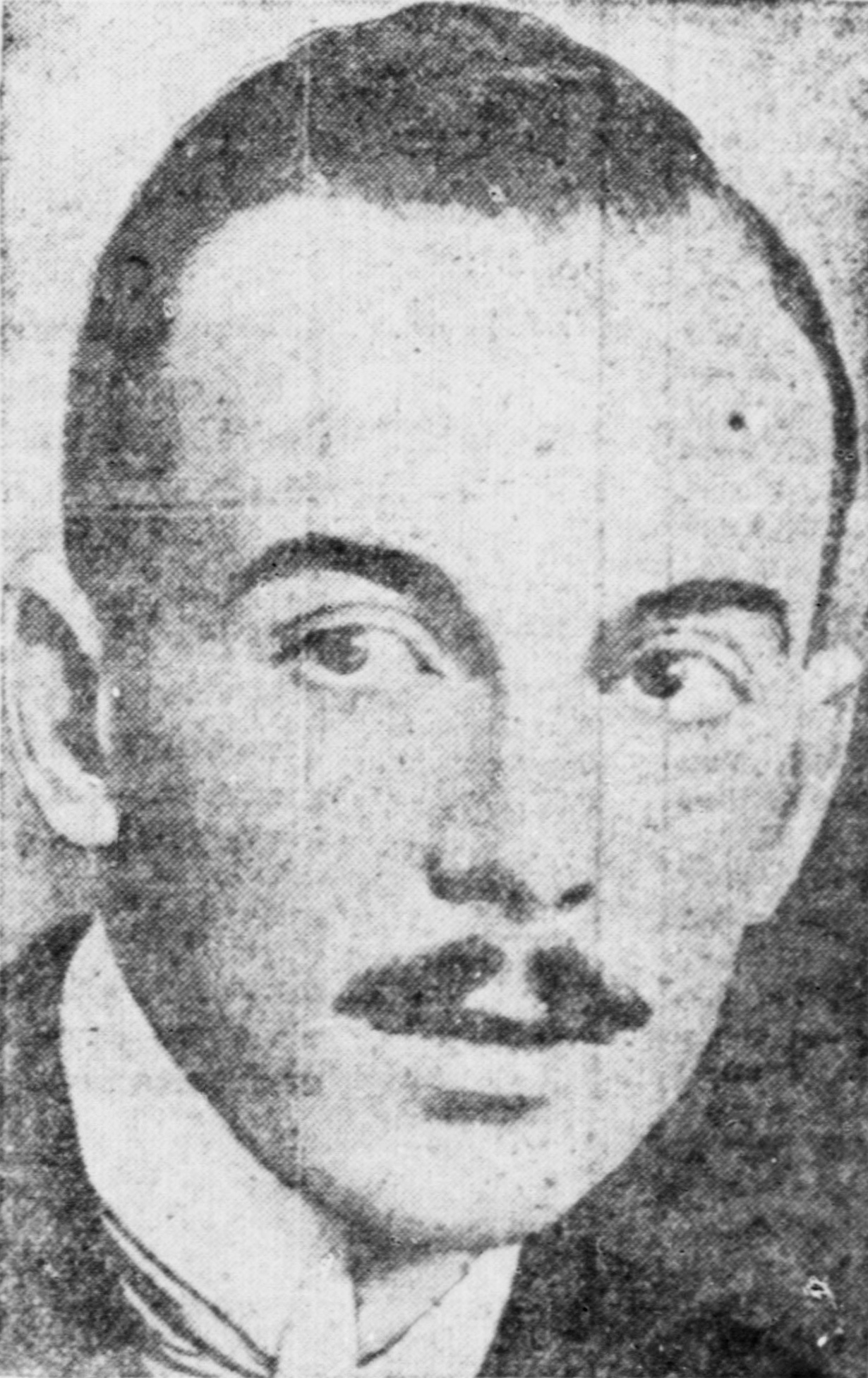
- Manville c. 1922
- Born: April 9, 1894
- Died: October 8, 1967 (aged 73)
- Resting place: Kensico Cemetery, Valhalla, New York
- Occupation: Businessperson

Thomas Franklyn Manville Jr. (April 9, 1894 – October 8, 1967) was an American socialite and heir to the Johns-Manville asbestos fortune. He was a celebrity in mid 20th-century Manhattan due to both his inherited wealth and his record-breaking 13 marriages to 11 women, which won him an entry in the Guinness Book of World Records. The termination of his marriages usually resulted in gossip, widespread publicity, and huge cash settlements.

== Early life and first wives ==
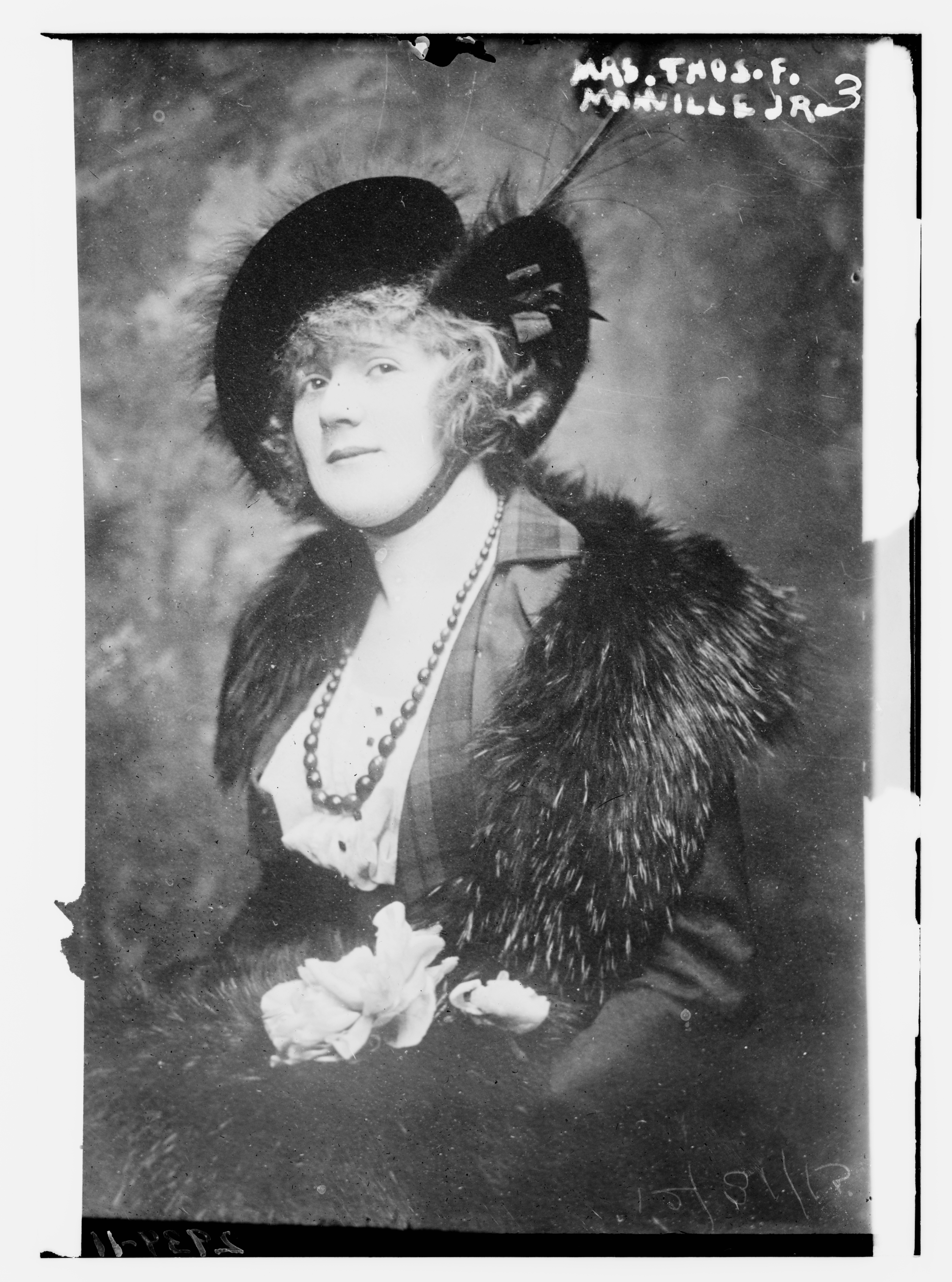
The first Mrs. Manville

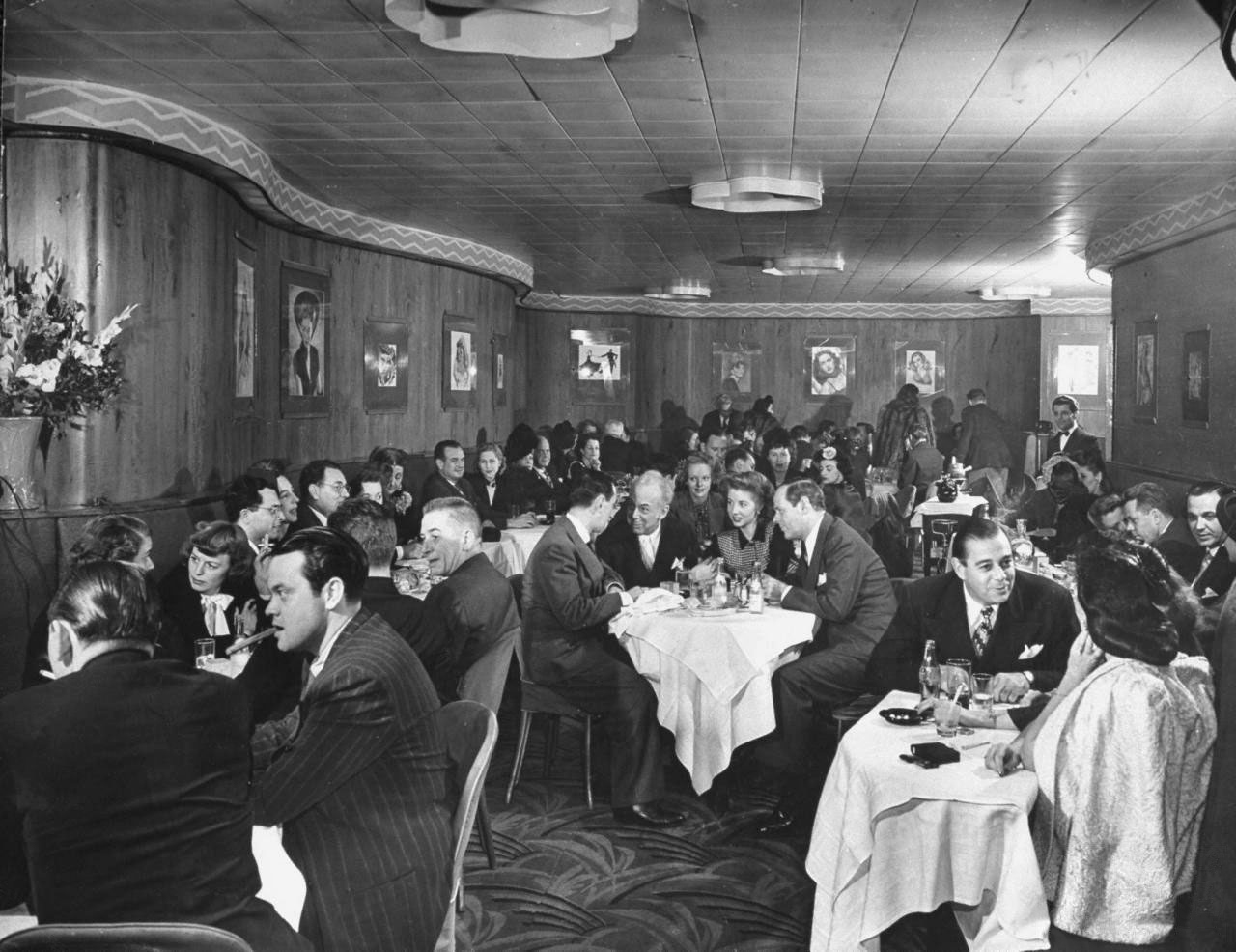
Manville (center) at the Stork Club in New York City (1944)

Born April 9, 1894, Thomas Franklyn Manville Jr. was the son and namesake of the founder and chairman of the Johns-Manville Corporation. His grandfather was Charles B. Manville. Manville stated that he and his father did not get along and that his father repeatedly disinherited him. However, Manville’s father always relented, and Manville received an inheritance after his father’s death. Among other accomplishments, his father became a director of Consolidated National Bank in 1904.

Determined to wed due to marital conditions in his trust, Manville was 17 years old in 1911 when he met Florence Huber (sometimes given as Hubert), a chorus girl, under a Broadway marquee. They were married five days later. Manville's father, who was traveling from Europe to the United States, said he would have the match annulled when he reached New York. Manville arranged a second wedding ceremony in New Jersey, tried to have another in Maryland, and said that he would, if necessary, remarry his bride in most of the then-46 states. When his father shut the family treasury against him, Manville took a $15-a-week job in the family's Pittsburgh factory in order to get by. Florence left him in 1917 after his repeated adultery, and their divorce was finalized in New York on April 25, 1922. In 1930 Florence, having divorced Robert P. Reid in 1926, sued Manville for $45,000 in unpaid settlement. She alleged that her husband and his father had agreed to pay her $15,000 per year to live apart from her husband. She dropped the suit in 1931.

Manville next married Lois Arline McCoin, his father's 22-year-old stenographer, in September 1925. The next month, his father died, leaving him about $10 million of a $50 million estate. In December 1930, McCoin secured a Reno divorce on grounds that Manville had deserted her in 1926. Her alimony was reported as $1,000 a month.

== Trust fund and estate ==
A trust fund left for Manville by his family purportedly "guaranteed him $250,000 when he married." In a 1995 article, The New York Times reported that Manville would "pay the woman $50,000, pocket $200,000, get a quickie divorce and then, when he needed more money, he'd get married again."

Manville owned the estate "Bon Repos" in the gated waterfront community of Premium Point on Long Island Sound in New Rochelle, New York. Manville soon began describing himself as a "retired businessman," or gave his occupation as "looking after my estate."

While he reveled in the publicity surrounding his marriages, Manville sought privacy on his estate. He equipped it with burglar alarms, peephole doors, armed guards, a public-address system, a radio in every room, and 20 telephones. He called the estate his fortress, and often wore two heavy pistols on his belt. In June 1967, while Manville was in Doctors Hospital, three gunmen wearing black masks invaded his estate and stole an undetermined amount of cash, jewelry, furs, and clothing. Manville had been in ill health for several years, and his eleventh wife, the former Christina Erdlen, was with him at the hospital when the estate was robbed.

== Later marriages ==
In total, Manville had eleven wives across thirteen marriages. Though the record is confused, there were two remarriages among Manville’s first ten marriages.

1. Florence Huber (1911-1922)
2. Lois Arline McCoin (1925-1930)
3. Avonne Taylor (1931-1931)
4. Marcelle Edwards (1933-1937)
5. Bonita "Bonnie" Edwards (1941-1942)
6. Wilhelmma Connelly "Billie" Boze (1942-1943)
7. Macie Marie "Sunny" Ainsworth (1943-1943)
8. Georgina Campbell (1945-1952)
9. Briton Anita Frances Roddy-Eden (1952-1952)
10. Pat Gaston (1957-1957)
11. Christina Erdlen (1960-1967)

This extraordinary cycle of marriage and divorce was Manville’s claim to celebrity. He reportedly used marriage as a means of personal publicity. In a story appearing under his name in the American Weekly magazine in 1936, he made sport of his marital propensities and pledged that his next wife would be a blonde—almost any blonde. The next year he took out full-page advertisements in New York newspapers, publicly seeking a new lawyer to represent him in family disputes.

In May 1931, he married as his third wife Avonne Taylor, a Ziegfeld Follies showgirl. She had been wed twice before. They separated after 34 days and got a Mexican divorce that November. In 1933, Taylor married actor Carlyle Blackwell.

In October 1933, Manville married his fourth wife Marcelle Edwards, a showgirl with The Earl Carroll Vanities. After some separations and reconciliations, they divorced in October 1937 with a reported $200,000 settlement to her.

In November 1941, he married his fifth wife Bonita "Bonnie" Edwards, a 22-year-old showgirl. They were divorced in January 1942.

In October 1942 he married his sixth wife Wilhelmma Connelly (Billie) Boze, a 20-year-old actress. They were divorced in February 1943; Boze distinguished herself among Manville's former wives by steadfastly refusing to take any money in settlement.

In August 1943, Manville married his seventh wife Macie Marie (Sunny) Ainsworth. She had been married four times by age 20. They were separated after eight hours and divorced in Reno in October 1943.

In December 1945, he married British-born Georgina Campbell, his eighth wife, who met when interviewing him for the Hobo News. Life magazine pictured her in front of photographs of her seven predecessors. She left him after five weeks and was reported to be seeking a divorce. They remained separated but had not divorced when she was killed in an automobile collision in 1952 while driving to have breakfast with him at "Bon Repos". He said they were not planning a reconciliation but had "been friends".

In July 1952 he married Briton Anita Frances Roddy-Eden, his ninth wife. She obtained a Mexican divorce in August, and accepted $100,000 in lieu of alimony. She divorced him again in Reno in 1955, and remarried actor John Sutton, who in 1960 was granted an annulment on the grounds that her 1955 divorce was invalid due to failure to satisfy the required residency period.

In May 1957, Manville married his tenth wife, Pat Gaston, a 26-year-old Texas showgirl. They divorced in November of that year.

In January 1960, Manville married his eleventh and final wife, Christina Erdlen from Heidenheim an der Brenz, West Germany. When they met she was a 20-year-old waitress in White Plains, New York, married to a barber and with a two-year-old daughter, Dianna Ocker. After his death, Christina inherited the bulk of his estate, valued at $1.1 million.

== Death and legacy ==
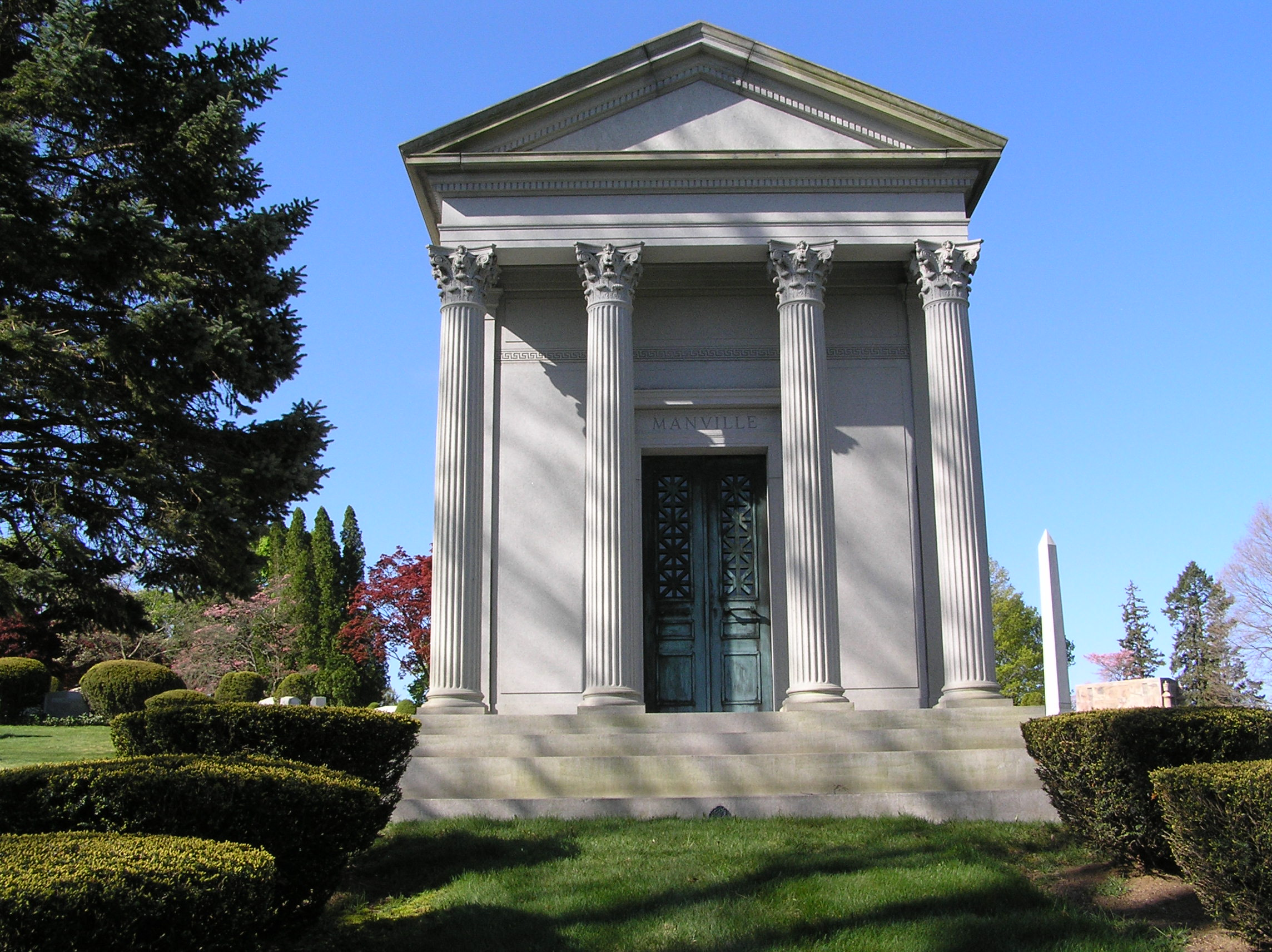
The mausoleum of Thomas Manville in Kensico Cemetery

Manville died on October 8, 1967. His ninth wife Anita Manville wrote a biography, The Wives and Lives of Tommy Manville, which was seen as the inspiration of the camp musical, Lucky Wonderful: 13 Musicals About Tommy Manville by Jackie Curtis. He was probably the model for Gary Cooper's character in the 1938 motion picture Bluebeard's Eighth Wife. Manville is also mentioned in Irving Berlin’s song "What Chance Have I with Love" ("Tommy Manville's love is not returned/He sells asbestos and he has learned/ That with asbestos he still gets burned") and in many other passing pop-culture references and metaphors.

Manville was considered something of a clown (an image he cultivated with his public persona—part bon vivant, part hapless tool of women), but was also secretly admired by some for his number of conquests and his extravagant bank account. At the time of his death it was estimated that Manville spent more than $1.25 million on divorce settlements.

== See also ==
- Page Morton Black
- Premium Point, New Rochelle
- Veronica Lake
- List of people who remarried the same spouse
