= Premium Point, New Rochelle =

Premium Point
- Neighborhood
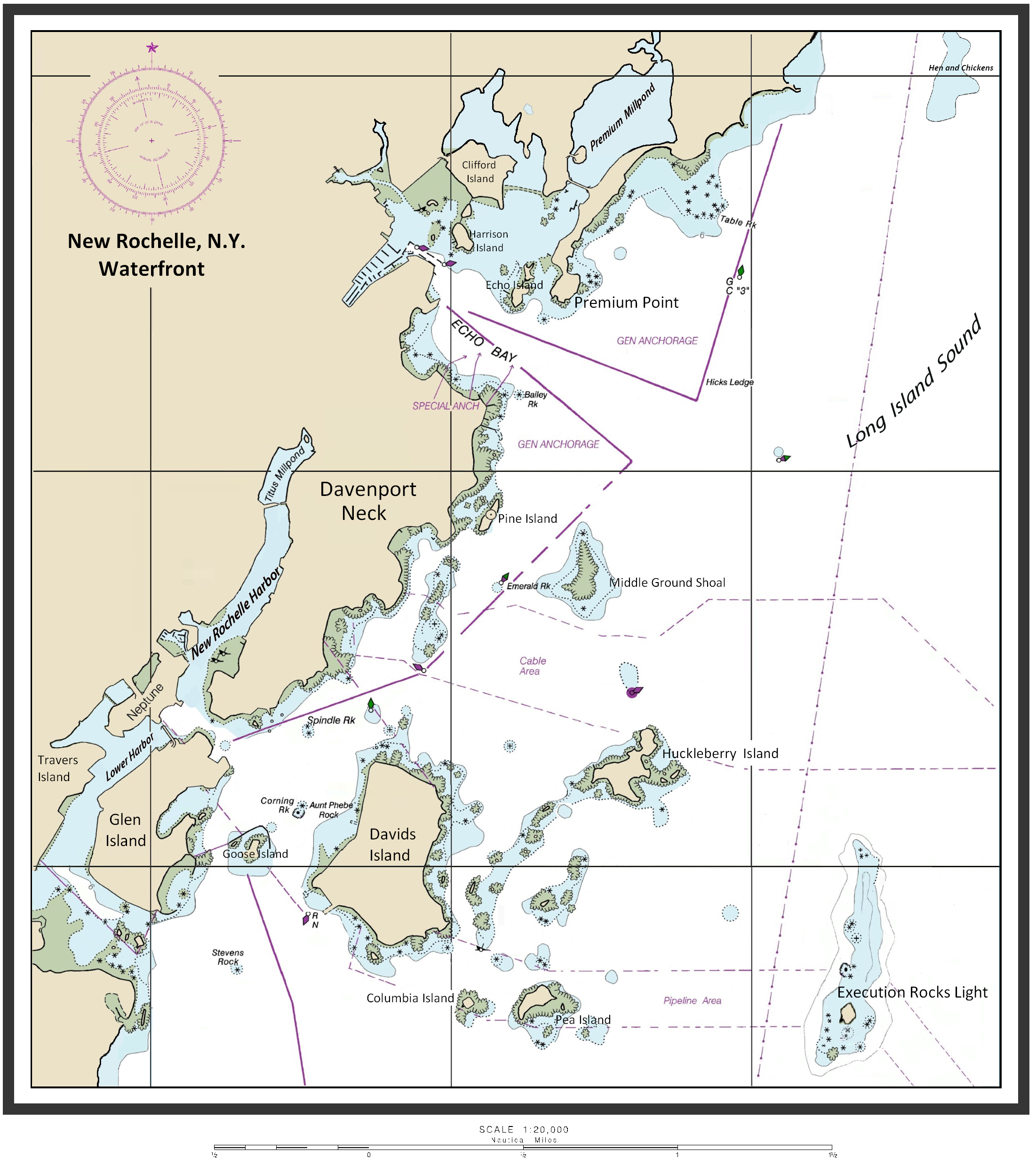
- Interactive map of Premium Point
- Coordinates: 40°54′39″N 73°45′33″W
- Country: United States
- State: New York
- County: Westchester
- Elevation: 846 ft (258 m)
- Time zone: UTC-5 (Eastern (EST))
  - Summer (DST): UTC-4 (EDT)
- ZIP codes: 10801

Premium Point is a guard-gated private community in the city of New Rochelle in Westchester County, New York, United States. The area consists of a series of small islands connected by bridges to a peninsular fronting on Long Island Sound and backing on Premium Mill Pond and Echo Bay. Much of the shore line of Premium Point is high and rocky, both on the Sound and on the Bay. Premium Mill Pond is located between the Premium Point peninsula and the mainland. It is fed by the Premium River and is separated from Echo Bay by the former Premium Mill dam.

The only vehicular access to Premium Point is through a guardhouse and wrought iron gates at the end of the half-mile long entrance, Premium Point Road. The community is organized into a small corporation and run by a board of trustees. All property owners are members and stockholders in the Premium Point Association, Inc. The board dictates much about life behind the gates, from road repairs to security. The Association levies an annual tax for the purpose of maintaining 24-hour police guards at the entrance; constructing and maintaining all the roadways, which are private; collecting refuse; maintaining two docks located on the peninsula; and cleaning septic tanks, as the area has no public sanitary sewers. In addition, the Association provides a private beach for the residents.

== History ==
=== Mott Mill ===
During the Revolutionary War, the Motts, a Quaker family, ran a gristmill at the far end of Premium Mill-Pond in the area now known as Pryer's Bridge on the border of New Rochelle and Larchmont. After the war, the old Mott's Mill at Pryer's Bridge was abandoned in favor of a new mill and dam which was built in 1801 on Mott's Neck (now known as Premium Point). This mill became known as Premium Mill. The mill was very large with ten run of stones which was later increased to twelve and every known improvement was introduced. Most of its flour was exported to Europe, and at the time it was reported to have been the country's largest flour-mill. In 1804 the sons, Robert and Samuel Mott, became the owners and managers of the mill, Robert Mott being the agent, residing in New York City, in partnership with John L. Bowne, under the name of "Mott & Bowne", and handled the exportation of the flour in large quantities, especially to France. Eventually, this once flourishing enterprise was forced to close because of international events such as the Napoleonic Wars, the blockade of American ports during the War of 1812, and the opening of the Erie Canal. Henry P. Kellogg became its owner in 1843 and held it for nearly forty years. The last use of the mill was for grinding barytes, after which it was abandoned to decay and was torn down in January and February, 1883.

=== Yachting ===
After the Civil War, The New York Yacht Club established a shore station on Long Island Sound, which began to attract more and more sailing activity to the area. At the same time, shorefront properties along Premium Point became prime locations for summer homes of wealthy New Yorkers including Henry Holt, CC Buell, TS Billings and JP Morgan.

One of the areas most influential residents was C. Oliver Iselin whose home All View was designed by Stanford White. Iselin was one of the greatest American Yachtsmen of all time, participating in and winning six consecutive America's Cup races - 1887, 1893, 1895, 1899, 1901 and 1903. He was influential in bringing the popularity of yacht racing to Long Island Sound shore communities of Westchester. He made New Rochelle the focal point of all the pre-racing activities, and through his participation brought to the community many well known individuals such as August Belmont, William K. Vanderbilt, Cornelius Vanderbilt, Joseph Choate and Sir Thomas Lipton. Racing yachts usually rode anchor in New Rochelle's upper harbor, off Echo Bay, through most of the summer months. Large mooring buoys were placed about a mile off Premium Point, and the same distance from shore off Green Flats and Pine Island. On race days, excursion steamers were chartered from Starin's Glen Island Park so that hundreds of New Rochelleans could follow Iselin's boats as they left Premium Point for New York and the start of the contests.

=== Suburban development ===
The area became more of a suburban destination in the late 1800s when the New York & New Haven Railroad opened a line along the sound shore of Westchester, building a stop in New Rochelle. The 30-minute train ride from Grand Central Terminal influenced its evolution into a community for Wall Street bankers and international businessman. The area's homes are a mix of architectural styles from Spanish-style Mediterranean mansions to French Provincial palaces, as well as a number of more modern, 'boxy' designs. Most homes overlook the water and have private beaches and mooring.

== Notable residents ==
- Bernard Arnault, billionaire, LVMH chairman
- William Black, Chock Full O'Nuts founder
- Page Morton Black singer, widow of William Black and Chairperson of the Parkinson's Disease Foundation from 1983 to 2012.
- Ron Bruder, entrepreneur; education advocate; named on the 2011 "TIME 100" list of the 100 most influential people in the world"
- Antonio Deinde Fernandez, African chief, billionaire
- Henry Holt, publisher and author
- C. Oliver Iselin, banker, yachtsman
- M. Farooq Kathwari, chairman and owner of Ethan Allen
- John Kluge, German-American television industry mogul (Metromedia) and billionaire
- Tommy Manville, heir to asbestos fortune
- Theodore C Marceau, photographer
- J. P. Morgan, business tycoon and industrialist
- Alfred Perlman, head of the New York Central Railroad
- Charles Revson, founder of Revlon
- Norman Rockwell, artist
- Tom Rogers (executive), founder CNBC and MSNBC; Longest serving CEO, TiVo
- Joe Torre, MLB player, manager of the New York Yankees
- Daniel Rice Weller, Chairman of Standard Oil
- Anthony Granata, Resident

== Links ==
Premium Point

- U.S. Geological Survey Geographic Names Information System: Premium Point
- Community Profile
- map

Premium Millpond

- U.S. Geological Survey Geographic Names Information System: Premium Millpond
- map

Oak Island

- U.S. Geological Survey Geographic Names Information System: Oak Island
