= Echo Bay (Long Island Sound) =

Bay in New Rochelle, New York, United States

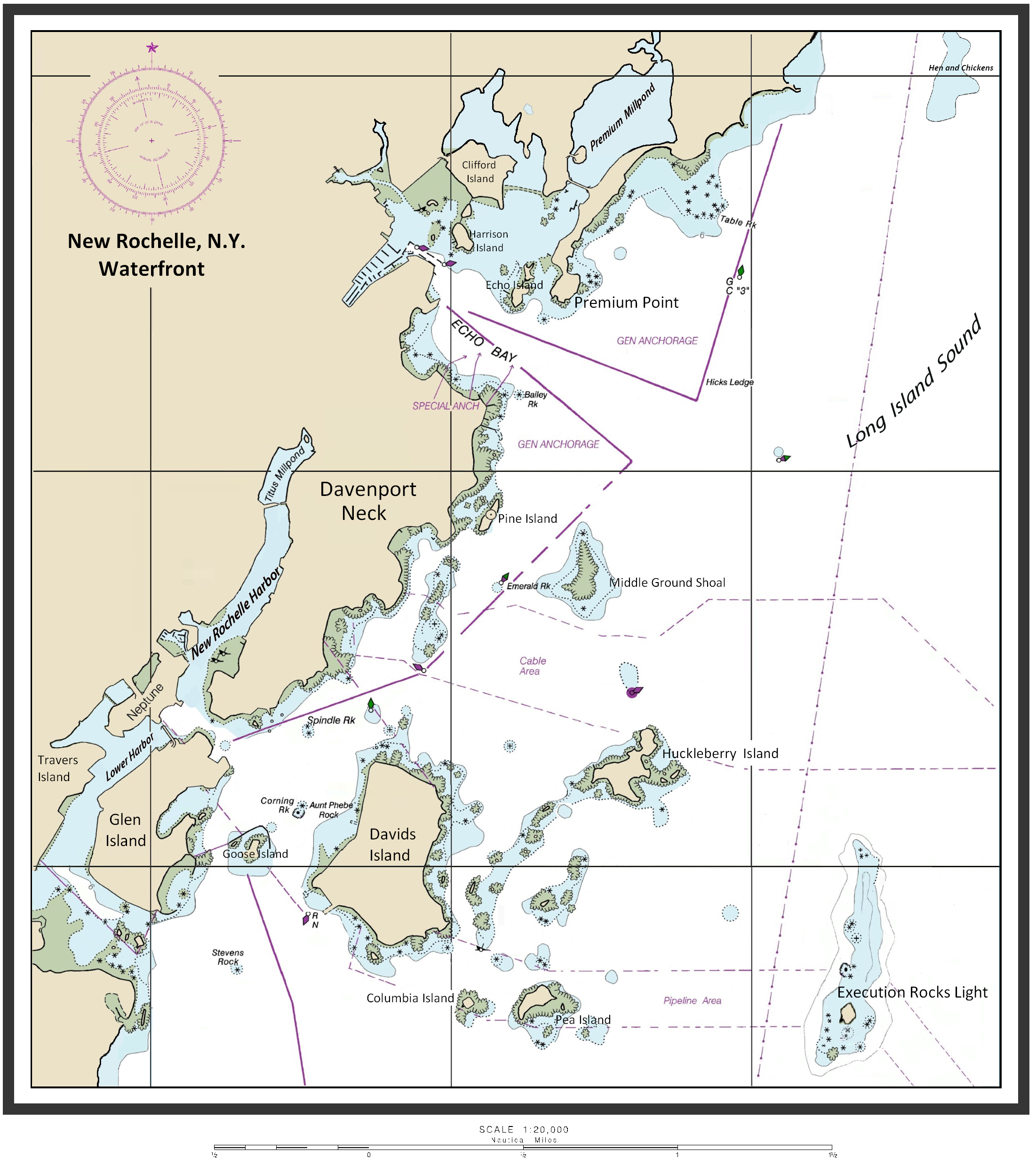
- Echo Bay and Harbor Management Area

- Location within New York
- Location: New Rochelle, New York
- Coordinates: 40.8957°N 73.7768°W
- Islands: Echo Island; Clifford; Harrison; Tank; Big Hassock; Little Hassock

Echo Bay is an embayment located off Long Island Sound in the city of New Rochelle in Westchester County, New York. It is an anchorage for small craft and is generally fully occupied during the summer. The depths at the anchorage range from 4 to 15 feet, and launches can anchor in the shallow cove on the northeast side of the harbor, entering between Harrison Islands and the rocky, grassy islet off the northwest side of Echo Island. Vessels frequently anchor between the entrance of Echo Bay and Hicks Ledge, in depths of 20 to 24 feet. On the northwest side of Echo Bay a dredged channel 100 feet wide and 15 feet deep, marked by buoys, leads to the New Rochelle Municipal Marina at Beaufort Point (Hudson Park).

== Coastal geography ==
Premium Point is on the northeast side of the entrance of Echo Bay. "Spindle Rock", lying 100 yards southwestward of Premium Point, is covered at high water, and is marked at its southwest end by a red buoy. "Table rock", bare at half tide, is on a reef which extends from the shore at a point 3/8 of a mile eastward of Premium Point. "Hicks Ledge", a small patch of rock with 8 feet over it, lies nearly 1/2 of a mile southwestward of Premium Point. The passage between "Spindle Rock" and Premium Point is practically blocked by rocks which are hidden even at low tide. "Baileys rock" is near the end of a reef which extends about 200 yards off the point of Davenport Neck on the southwest side at the entrance of Echo Bay. The rock is marked on its eastern side by a gas buoy.

Islands within the bay include Harrison, Echo, Clifford, Tank and Big and Little Hassock islands.

Southwest of Echo Bay there is a stone pier which protects a private boat landing on its southwest side. Pine Island is privately owned and covered with brush. Two bare rocks lie 200 yards southwestward of Pine Island. Southwestward of the rocks there is a long, bare ledge, the southwest end of which is marked by a spindle with a cage. Between the spindle and two other spindles southward of it, there is a channel used by small craft navigating between Echo Bay and New Rochelle Harbor.

== History ==
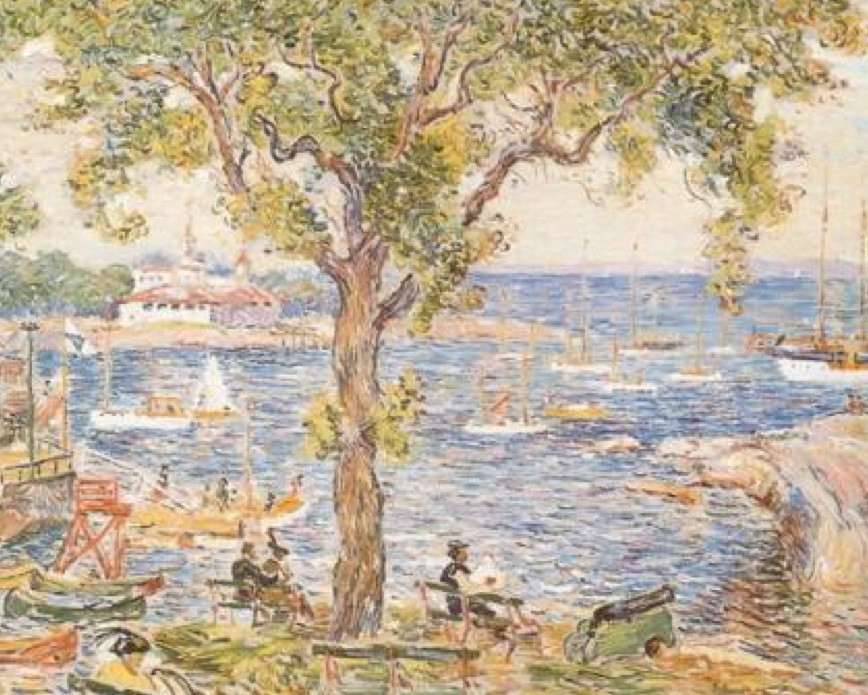

In 1690, Jean Machet acquired the property that is now the New Rochelle Municipal Marina, from Jacob Leisler to develop his shipbuilding and trading business with the West Indies. He continued to own this land, as well as Echo Bay Island, until 1694 when he sold it to Joshua Ferris, a Tory, who renamed it Ferris Creek.

Joshua Ferris ran a tavern on his property which became popular with Shubel Merritt and his gang of ruthless outlaws, the "Skinners". At the end of the Revolutionary War, Shubel Merritt was shot and killed in the Black Walnut Tavern at the corner of Old Town Dock and Pelham Roads. Enoch Crosby, General Washington's most celebrated spy was said to have started his career at the Ferris Tavern. In 1827, David Harrison purchased the land and built a dock in an attempt to revive it as a local landing site. Snuff Mill Creek, located next to Sutton Manor, was built in the early 18th century by Jacob Leisler Jr. and operated as a grist mill along with a mill at Crystal Lake. It was later owned by David Lispenard and used as a snuff mill. Over succeeding years it passed through the hands of a number of Quakers, including one who was supposedly active in the movement to liberate slaves. The mill was said to have been used as a stop for the Underground Railroad. This area eventually became the home of the New Rochelle Coal and Lumber Company.

In 1945, the City acquired it for use as the Municipal Marina. It underwent a series of major improvements including the construction of a boat house and bulkheads, and the grading and paving of the dock area. The dredging of Ferris Creek and the construction of new piers and slips to accommodate small boats made the City into a boating center. In the 1960s, a $2.3 million investment by the City transformed the marina into a major boating facility. The 5.3 acre Municipal Marina, one of the largest on Long Island Sound, contains 100 moorings and 500 berths, 55 of which can accommodate vessels longer than 30 feet.
