= List of islands of New York (state) =

The following is a list of islands found within New York State.

- Alder Island
- Alger Island
- Association Island
- Barnum Island
- Beeren Island
- Big Crow Island
- Big Hassock Island
- Bird Island
- Black Banks Island
- Broad Channel Island
- Brother Island
- Calumet Island
- Captree Island
- Carleton Island
- Catwright Island
- Cayuga Island
- Cedar Island, half of which is in Cedar Island State Park
- Cedar Island (Babylon)
- Cedar Island (Shelter Island)
- Cedar Island (Nassau County)
- Center Island
- Cinder Island
- City Island
- Clifford Island
- Colonels Island, New York
- Columbia Island
- Coney Island
- Constellation Rock
- Constitution Island
- Crab Island (Lake Champlain)
- Crab Island (Long Island Sound)
- Croil Island
- Croyle Island
- Cuba Island
- Dark Island
- Davids Island
- Dayton Island
- Deer Island
- Deowongo Island
- Duck Island
- East Island (Long Island Sound)
- East Island (Hempstead, New York)
- East Aler Island
- East Channel Island
- East Crow Island
- East Fire Island
- Echo Island
- Egg Island
- Elder Island
- Ellis Island
- Eatons Neck
- Fire Island
- Fish Island
- Flat Rock Island
- Fishers Island
- Frenchman Island
- Frontenac Island
- Galloo Island
- Galop Island
- Gardiners Island
- Gardiners Point
- Gatamby Rock
- Georges Island
- Gilgo Island
- Glen Island
- Goat Island
- Goose Island (Bronx, New York)
- Goose Island (New Rochelle, New York)
- Governors Island
- Grand Island
- Grass Island
- Great Island
- Great Gull Island
- Green Island
- Grenadier Island
- Grenell Island
- Grindstone Island
- Harrison Island
- Hart Island
- Hen Island
- Hewlett Hassock
- Hicks Island
- High Island
- Hoffman Island
- Hog Island
- Hospital Island
- Howland Island (Montezuma WMA)
- Huckleberry Island
- Ingraham Hassock Island
- Indian Island (Bay Shore West)
- Indian Island (Mattituck)
- Iona Island
- Ironsides Island
- Islands of the Bronx
- Isle of Meadows
- Jeckyl Island
- John Boyle Island
- Jones Island
- Jones Beach Island
- Lanes Island
- Liberty Island
- Little Cedar Island
- Little Galloo Island
- Little Goose Island
- Little Gull Island
- Little Island
- Little Ram Island
- Long Beach Island
- Long Island
- Long Meadow Island
- Low Island
- Luna Island
- Manhattan Island
- Manursing Island
- Meadow Island
- Meadowmere Park Island
- Middle Crow Island
- Middle Line Island
- Mill Rock
- Money Island
- Moss Island
- Murray Isle
- Neptune Island
- New Made Island
- Nezeras Island
- Nicoll Island
- North Black Banks Hassock Island
- North Brother Island
- North Cinder Island
- North Dumpling Island
- North Line Island
- North Manursing Island
- North Meadow Island
- Oak Island (Bay Shore West)
- Oak Island (New Rochelle) (in Premium Mill-Pond)
- Olivers Island
- Oscawana Island
- Outer Barrier Islands
- Paradise Island
- Parsonage Island
- Pattersquash Island
- Pearsalis Hassock
- Pelican Island
- Penny Island
- Pine Island
- Pea Island
- Plum Island
- Pollopel Island
- Prall's Island
- Ram Island
- Randalls and Wards Islands (joined)
- Rat Island
- Reedy Island
- Ridge Island
- Rikers Island
- Robins Island
- Rock Island
- Ruffle Bar
- Roosevelt Island
- Sand City Island
- Sanford Island
- Schodack Island
- Schuyler Island
- Sea Dog Island
- Seamans Island
- Sedge Island (Gardiners Island West)
- Sedge Island (New Rochelle)
- Sedge Island (Quogue)
- Seganus Thatch Island
- Sexton Island
- Shelter Island
- Shoofly Island
- Shooters Island
- Short Beach Island
- Simmons Hassock
- Snipe Island
- South Black Banks Hassock
- South Brother Island
- South Dumpling Island
- South Line Island
- Star Island
- Staten Island
- Strawberry Island
- Skenoh Island (Formerly Squaw Island (Canandaigua Lake)
- Swinburne Island
- Tank Island
- Thatch Island
- The Hassock
- Throggs Neck
- Three Cornered Hassock
- Thousand Islands
- Three Sisters Islands
- Townsend Island
- Travers Island
- U Thant Island (Belmont Island)
- Unity Island (formerly known as Squaw Island [Buffalo])
- Valcour Island
- Valiant Rock
- Van Rensselaer Island
- Van Schaick Island
- Wansers Island
- Warner Island
- West Island, previously known as Dosoris Island, also known as Dana's Island or Salutation Island
- West Crow Island
- West Fire Island
- Westhampton Island
- Wicopesset Island
- Wood Tick Island
- Wreck Island
- Wright Island
- Wellesley Island
- Youngs Island

== See also ==
- List of smaller islands in New York City
