= Pea Island (New Rochelle, New York) =

Island in Westchester County, New York, United States

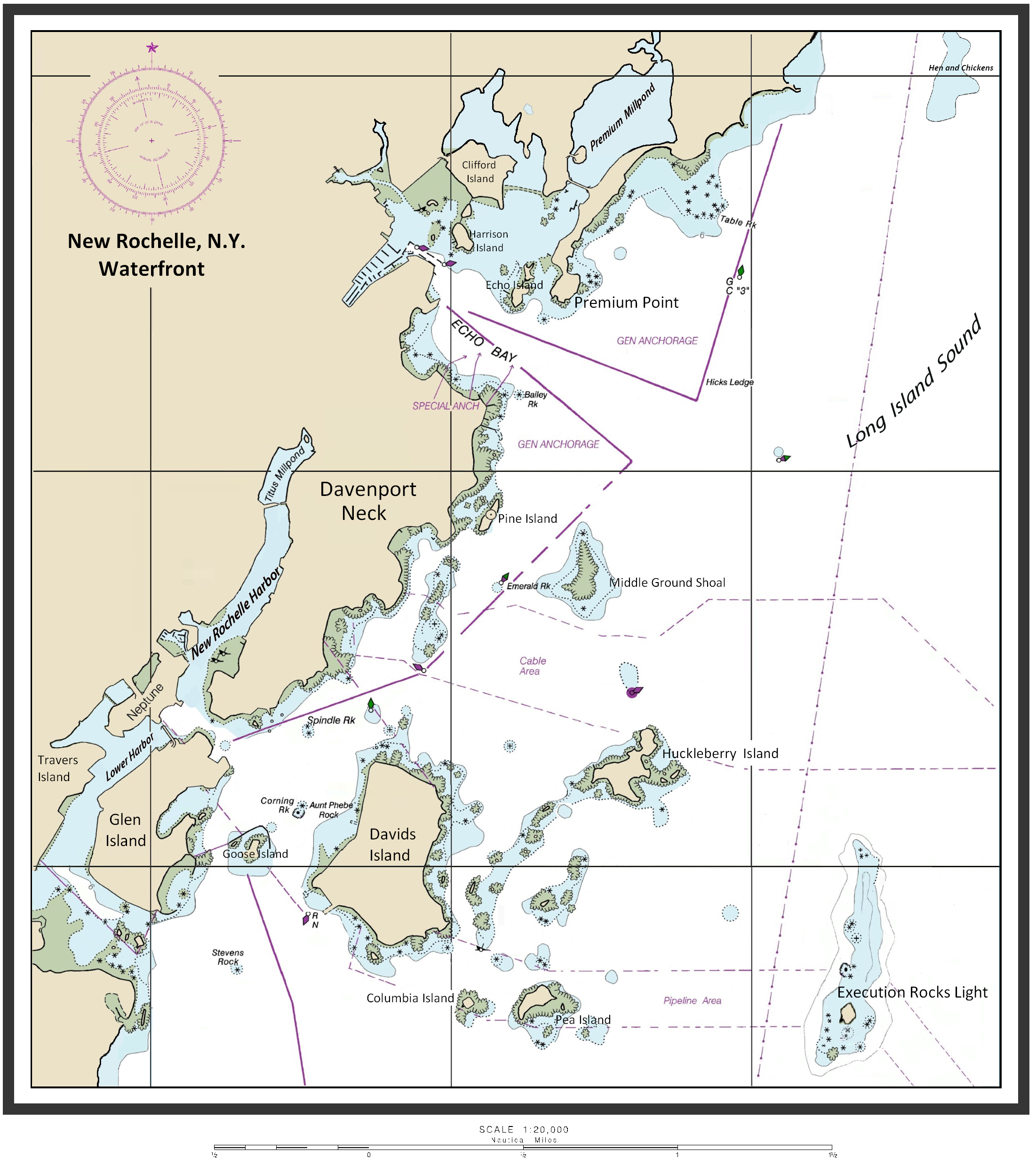
- Interactive map of Pea Island

Geography
- Location: Long Island Sound
- Coordinates: 40.877322°N 73.762354°W
- Area: 2 acres (0.81 ha)

Administration
- United States
- State: New York
- County: Westchester
- City: New Rochelle

Demographics
- Population: 0
- Pop. density: 0/km^{2} (0/sq mi)

Pea Island is a small island in Long Island Sound and a part of the city of New Rochelle in Westchester County, New York. It features a rocky, grass-covered terrain, with exposed rocks at low tide. The island lies approximately 1 mile (1.6 km) from the New Rochelle shore, adjacent to Davids and Columbia islands. It is the southernmost location in New Rochelle.

Pea Island was once owned by the Huguenot Yacht Club which is based on nearby Neptune Island in New Rochelle's "Lower Harbor". A 1992 storm destroyed most of the club's structures on the Island.

In June 2019, Pea Island and nearby Columbia Island were jointly put on sale with a list price of $13 million.
