= Goose Island (Long Island Sound) =

Island in New Rochelle, New York, United States

- Interactive map of Goose Island

Geography
- Location: Long Island Sound
- Coordinates: 40.8842665°N 73.7776326°W

Administration
- United States
- New Rochelle, New York

Goose Island is a small, rocky island in Long Island Sound and a part of the city of New Rochelle in Westchester County, New York. The island is situated between Davids, Travers, and Glen islands in New Rochelle's Lower Harbor area, just west of New Rochelle's border with New York City. It is surrounded by a stone wall which shows above the water.

== See also ==
- New York islands
