= Brigantine Inlet =

Coordinates: 39°26′47″N 74°19′35″W

Brigantine Inlet is an inlet connecting Little Bay with the Atlantic Ocean in Atlantic County, New Jersey.

== Geography ==
Brigantine Inlet separates Brigantine Island from Little Beach, and including its continuation, Brigantine Channel, connects Little Bay with the Atlantic Ocean.

It was described in 1834 as,

Brigantine Inlet, Old, formerly through Brigantine Beach, on the Atlantic, now closed.

Brigantine Inlet was described in 1878, viz.,

Brigantine Inlet is at the north part of Brigantine Beach, and separates it from Little Beach. This is an unimportant inlet, narrow, and having only about five feet of water on its bar.

== History ==
Brigantine Inlet is named on a map published in 1749 by Lewis Evans, although it appears, unlabeled, on earlier maps. The inlet had closed by 1800, about the time of the opening of Little Egg Inlet, and, as abovementioned, was still closed in 1834. Shortly thereafter, Brigantine Inlet had reopened. The Annual Report of the New Jersey State Geologist for 1905 addressed and described the dynamic of the opening and closing of inlets in the Little Egg Harbor area:

The birth of "New Inlet" is ascribed to the closing of Brigantine Inlet, prior to 1800, and to the gradual reduction in size of the Old Inlet, by the growth of the spit southward, so that for a time the enlargement of New Inlet compensated for the loss of capacity in the former openings. Between 1800 when New Inlet opened and 1874 when the "Old Inlet" (Little Egg) had so far closed that "people walked across it," there were two openings as shown on the chart of 1840, each a mile wide with Tucker's Island, two miles long, lying between them. As the northern opening closed the southern half of the Island was cut away so that this southern opening became two miles wide in 1870. Soon after this date the outer or Long Beach, which had been growing parallel to Tucker's Island, effected a junction with its remaining half, formed a typical hook, and closed completely the "Old Inlet" converting the island into a peninsula. The inner middle ground, known as Anchorage Island, nearly 1½ miles long and ½ a mile wide in 1840, has worn away until it is a mere speck on the chart of 1904. In 1878 New Inlet was at its best, but it is now shoaling. In 1803 vessels drawing from 15 to 18 feet entered this harbor at high water. These changes were affected also by changes at Brigantine Inlet, which was reported to have closed before 1800, again opened (in latitude 39º 27') before 1840 and afterword to have drifted southward ½ mile in 30 years, or at the rate of 88 feet per annum. During this time period (1840-1870) great changes took place in length and position of "Short" or "Brigantine" Beach, the coast of which, between New and Brigantine inlets was swung to the southwest-by-south and elongated at both ends, but, since 1870, it has lost these accretions and the existing coast line of 1904 is again so modified as to be hardly recognizable. The anchor-shaped island which has formed to the east of Brigantine Beach is suggestive as to the direction of the prevailing forces, having the flukes thrown back parallel to the shank, and all lying in a southwest course. The survey of 1904 also shows a material reduction in the width and direction of New Inlet, due to the extensive shoal covering the site of Grassy Channel and reaching as far as to the former Anchorage Island, thus changing the direction of the main currents through the inlet and causing the bar channels to shift.

== See also ==
- Brigantine Island
- Little Beach
