= Huguenot Yacht Club (Long Island Sound) =

Private yacht club in New York, US

- Burgee
- Short name: HYC
- Founded: February 8, 1895; 130 years ago
- Location: New Rochelle, Westchester County, New York United States
- Website: http://huguenotyc.com

The Huguenot Yacht Club (HYC) is a private yacht club located on Neptune Island along New Rochelle Harbor in the city of New Rochelle in Westchester County, New York. The club offers a number of boating activities, including yacht racing, frostbiting, one-design sail boat racing, and junior sailing.

== History ==
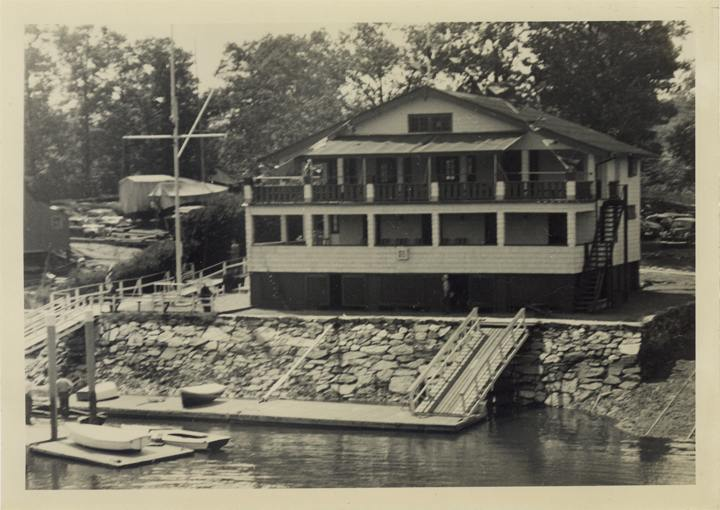

The club was founded and first organized in 1894 under the name "Neptune Yacht Club". The name was soon changed to "Huguenot Yacht Club" (HYC) to commemorate the founders of the community, the Huguenots, who settled the area after fleeing religious persecution in France. The club opened its doors on January 1, 1895 and officially incorporated on February 8, 1895. At that time the club was located just outside the bridge crossing to Glen Island Park on Neptune Island, in 2 small buildings leased from its owner Adrian G Iselin.

The first regatta held by the club was on April 27, 1895. In 1910 there were 65 boats registered at the club of which 27 were sail boats. The largest of these was the sailing houseboat Savilla 86' with a 24' beam.

HYC is a founding member of US Sailing, the "Yacht Racing Association of Long Island Sound" and the "Junior Sailing Association of Long Island Sound".

== Facilities ==
HYC's location on Neptune Island in New Rochelle's Lower Harbor provides the club with one of the most sheltered harbor facilities on Long Island Sound. The club has the best berthing facilities on the Sound. The channel has a twelve-foot depth, Davenport Neck and Glen Island form natural protection from all winds. The marina has slips for some sixty yachts, currently with lengths of 22 to 60 feet. The club also has a number of floating docks. The four floating docks to the west of the Glen Island Bridge have fixed pilings, water and electric power, as do the two larger docks to the west. There are additional floating docks to the east of the bridge which have water. During the season, the docks are reached by tender service. In addition to floating docks, there are a number of moorings to the east of the bridge that are also serviced by the club's tender. The club has a 30-ton Travilift and a crane to haul yachts and step masts. The club offers wet or dry winter storage and Club members are allowed to work on their own yachts while observing proper rules.

HYC owned Pea Island which lies approximately 1 mile from the New Rochelle shore, adjacent to Columbia Island until 2014. In 1992 a violent storm wrecked most of the structures built by the club since the 1930s, and the island has seen little use since then. Efforts to rebuild the island were foiled by the high cost of construction required to meet the government's FEMA regulations.

== Activities ==
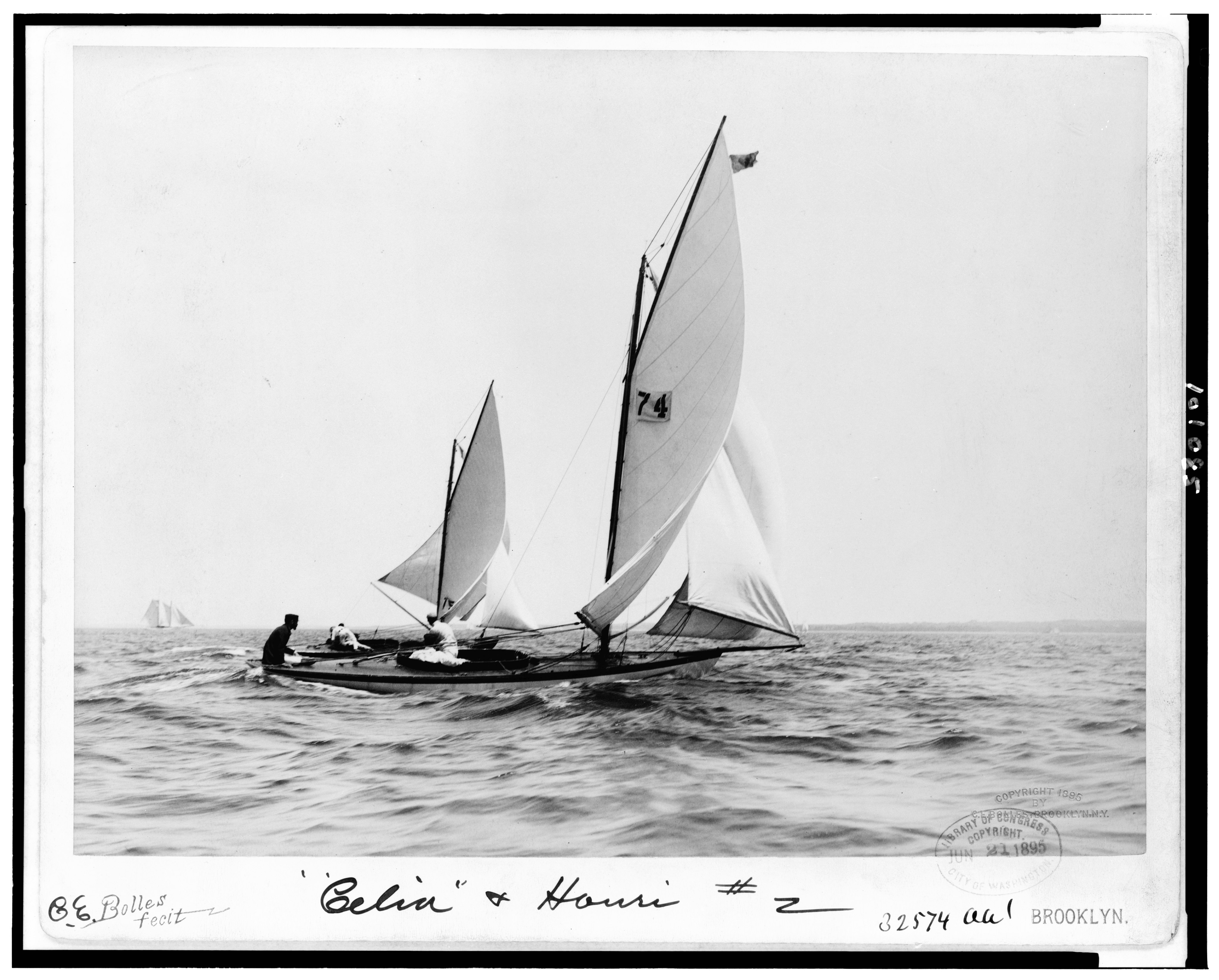
Celia beating Houri at the first Open Regatta of the Club sailed off New-Rochelle in 1895

Club members take part in organized racing and boating events throughout the season. The Club sponsors several races each year, including;

- "Expressly for Fun Regatta"
- "Mayor's Cup Race"
- "Commodore's Cup Race"

In addition, the club has an annual Club Cruise for power and sail boats.

In recent years, members have chartered a vintage 12-meter yacht and competed in a Columbus Day Weekend 12-Meter Regatta. Members also take part in Thursday night sailboat races on Long Island Sound as part of the Can One Evening Racing Association, which Huguenot members helped to found. Club sailing ends the season with the 'Turkey Day Reach', hosted alternate years by its neighbor, the New York Athletic Club.
