= Thaddeus Davids =

American businessman (1810–1894)

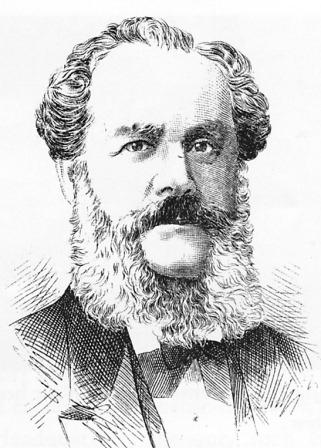
Thaddeus Davids

Thaddeus Davids (November 16, 1810 – July 22, 1894) was a 19th-century New York businessman who, in partnership with his brothers, built one of the largest ink companies in the world at the time.

== Biography ==
Davids was born in Bedford, New York. His family moved to New York City when Thaddeus was thirteen years old. There he entered the employ of an ink manufacturer who, when he died, left the company to Thaddeus, however, because he was still a minor, the business had to be listed in his father's name, William Davids. During this early period he failed to receive payment for a government contract and gave up the business, going to sea for a short time. Upon returning, he entered the business again and prospered with his manufacture of quality ink. An 1829/30 New York Directory listing still had William Davids, Chemist, in the listing. Thaddeus would have become of legal age in 1831.

Davids’ introduction of steel pen ink in 1827 was his best product at the time and was guaranteed to write black and be of "record" quality. By 1833, Davids was making ink similar to English inks, which he called "chemical writing fluid", and added indigo for more color. Davids continued with more innovative and improved inks in the following years, and his inks became as good as, or better than, any on the market. In 1856, an experiment by a well known chemist listed his as the least fading ink on the market when compared with such names as "Maynard & Noyes", "Harrison's Columbian" and "Blackwood's". This was an important factor for businesses and government. These results were copied and used on bottle labels and trade cards handed out by the company at the 1876 Centennial in Philadelphia.

By the late 1830s, Davids was prosperous enough that he wanted to buy a country place in New Rochelle, New York, a short distance from New York City. Leaving the business in the hands of his partner, he took some time negotiating for the New Rochelle property. When he returned to the city, he found out his partner had somehow managed to sell the business and ruin him. Instead of being wealthy, Davids was $700 in debt, but with hard work, he entered the business again for himself at 112 John Street in 1840. Davids intended to move the company to New Rochelle in 1854 however the old mill being renovated for the ink factory burned. This mill had been used for making sealing wax and wafers. An 1888 article in a N.Y. magazine said they still maintained two factories in New Rochelle. Mostly likely this was the John B. Davids Company and a factory for the production of wax, wafers and miscellaneous products.

After moving back to New York City, manufacturing plants and offices were at 127 and 129 William Street. At the William Street factory, they made thirty-three different inks as well as other products. The steel pen ink was still being made from the original formula at least through the early 1900s. In 1856 a son, George W. Davids, was admitted as a partner, and the company became known as Thaddeus Davids and Company. The company continued to grow and prosper under Thaddeus and his sons. But in 1883, he was ruined again, this time by his son George, a senior partner and financial manager of the company. George, unbeknown to his father, had incurred debts far more than the assets of the company using the company as collateral. When these debts became known and due in early 1883, the company couldn't pay them. In April of that year, The New York Times reported the apparent suicide of George W. Davids in a New York City hotel from an overdose of laudanum. Thaddeus, being the honorable man he was known to be, sold everything he owned, including his New Rochelle properties, to pay off creditors. The company went into a receivership with another son and junior partner, David, at the helm. It was reorganized as a stock company, and the business continued. Thaddeus suffered a stroke soon after this from which he never fully recovered. The last decade of his life was spent suffering from gout and the effects of the stroke.

Under David F. Davids the company again prospered. He and his brother Edwin took the company into the 20th century. With David's death in 1905, and Edwin's in 1907, other family members took over. In 1908 the company moved to Vandam Street. The Vandam factory made use of electricity and was completely up to date in the manufacturing process. Machines powered by electric motors did work previously done by hand.

Besides the ink business, Davids purchased a lot of real estate which enhanced his fortune. He bought several properties, which he divided up into house lots in New Rochelle where he eventually made his home. Perhaps his best known land purchase was an island just off the shoreline of New Rochelle with intentions of moving his ink factory there that became known as Davids Island. Instead he leased (and later sold) it to someone else, who leased it to and later sold it to the U.S. Government who used it as Fort Slocum. During the Civil War, this island was used to hold Confederate prisoners. DeCamp Hospital was established to house wounded soldiers from both sides. His New Rochelle estate, "Echo Place", was sold to George W. Sutton in 1884, and was later developed by Sutton's Heirs into the upscale residential enclave Sutton Manor.

The last six years of his life, he was confined to his room, unable to walk, although his mind was unimpaired until the last. His problems with gout were severe. He is quoted in many ads for the St. Jacobs Oil Company as saying this oil healed his gout. Apparently it didn't, as that was a major health problem until the end of his life, so most likely he was paid for this endorsement. As many old obituaries do, his last words were noted, his being "Home, Sweet Home." Thaddeus Davids died at his New Rochelle home on July 22, 1894. He was buried in Beechwoods Cemetery in New Rochelle, New York.
