= Little Beach, New Jersey =

Coordinates: 39.4711°N 74.3205°W

Little Beach is a barrier island along the coast of New Jersey. It is believed to be the last uninhabited barrier island left on the U.S. Atlantic coast. It is part of Galloway Township, in Atlantic County, New Jersey.

The island is now part of the Edwin B. Forsythe National Wildlife Refuge. Access is permitted only to researchers, who must apply for a federal permit.

"Little Beach" was not always uninhabited and contained a small collection of fishing cabins that were used for decades before being burned down to make the island a refuge. In addition, Little Beach, like Brigantine, was a popular summer fishing spot for the Lenape Natives for generations.

== Geography ==
Little Beach is a barrier island along the Atlantic Ocean between Little Egg Inlet on the northeast, and Brigantine Inlet on the southwest. An expanse of salt marsh and tidal channels separates Little Beach from Great Bay and Little Bay.

Little Beach was described in 1834 as,

Little Beach, Burlington co. [sic], Little Egg Harbour t-ship, between Little Egg Harbour, New Inlet, and Old Brigantine Inlet.

An 1878 description of Little Beach is as follows, viz,

Little Beach lies between Little Egg Harbor Inlet and Brigantine and is a part of what was formerly attached to Short Beach before the New Inlet broke through. It is two or three miles long, a low, flat, barren island, and has never been inhabited. A hotel for sea-bathing was commenced on it in the summer of 1877, and is not yet finished.

== History ==
In the early 20th century, Little Beach was a community on the verge of becoming a major beach resort. Plans to build a bridge from the mainland (Route S4A) were abandoned in 1929, forever isolating Little Beach. For that reason, some call it the "Lost Island of New Jersey."

A few signs of a once-active community remain: ruins of a lifesaving station, poles for power lines, an outhouse, and a deteriorating dock stretching the width of the island.
