= Columbia Island =

Columbia Island may refer to several places:

- Columbia Island (New York), U.S., in Long Island Sound
- Columbia Island (District of Columbia), U.S., in the Potomac River
