= Glen Island Park Bath House =

Historic site in the United States

Coordinates: 40.8830°N 73.7832°W

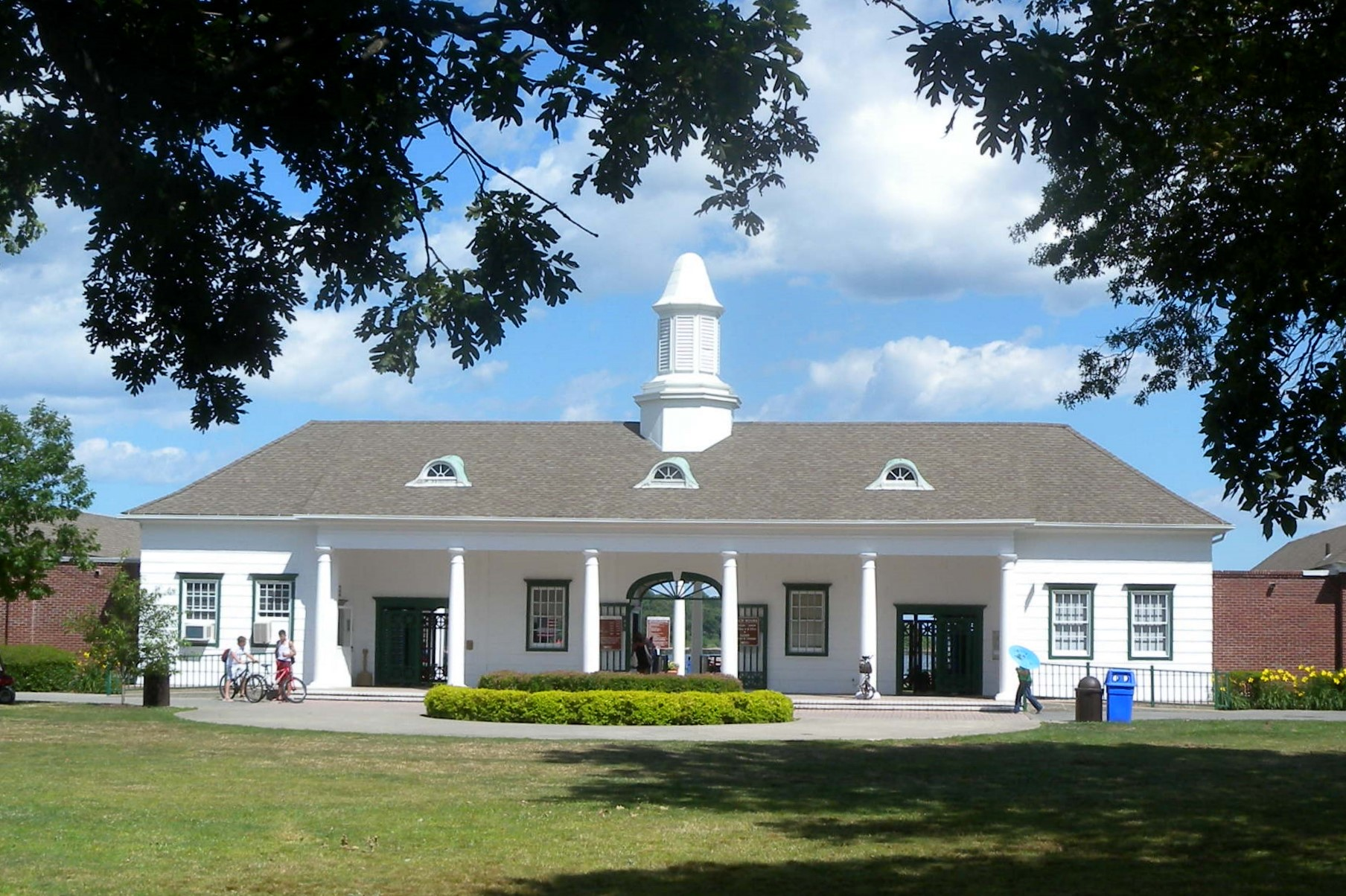

The Glen Island Park Bath House is a building in Glen Island Park in the city of New Rochelle, New York. By the 1920s, with suburban growth rapidly increasing in Westchester County, the park was established by the Westchester County Parks Commission to provide recreational space for almost two million visitors a year in the early 1930s.

Glen Island Park’s landscape was designed by landscape architect Gilmore David Clarke. Many of his 1920s features survive today, including a five span steel arch drawbridge to the mainland, a tree lined road terminating at a roundabout, parking lots, and a bath house separating the enlarged crescent shaped beach from a circular play field. The park’s circulation pattern prioritizes personal automobile transportation with the character and use of the park remaining consistent for over 80 years.

== Architecture ==
The Glen Island Park Bath House, designed by Clinton F. Loyd in 1928 and completed in 1929, consists of a one-story, seven by three bay, U-shaped central block in the Colonial Revival Style with shingle cladding and two rectangular wing additions to the north and south. The steeply pitched, asphalt clad, hipped roof shelters the U-shaped main block. Double hung windows light the interior which houses administrative offices.

An oversized cupola and three eyebrow windows rise above the roof structure and accent the buildings Colonial Revival aesthetic on the park side (west elevation). The beach side (east elevation) opens to an attractive courtyard which is created by the U-shaped building and an open roof structure, which is supported by columns. The north and south wings are sheltered by a contemporary mansard roof and clad in modern brick and polished concrete block veneer. These newer additions have a modern neo-colonial aesthetic that is complementary to the original central block, but differs from the building’s original 1928 design. These structures are support buildings that shelter the restrooms, showers, and changing stations for visitors of the park and bathing beach.

The central block of the bath house is reminiscent of the original design seen in the 1928 architectural plans and in historic photographs. The minor changes include alterations to the original fenestration and the park side, vinyl window replacements, replacement of original columns with wider modern fiberglass columns, and the removal of an attractive balustrade on the beach side above the porch roof. The most impactful change, however, is the replacement of the building’s original restroom and shower wings. As originally constructed, these structures were lower and longer, with either a flat or open roof structure that created a theme of horizontality contrasting with and accenting the verticality of the main block’s Colonial Revival aesthetic. The original wings were constructed out of concrete in an Art Deco motif as a popular material and aesthetic of the time period. The most interesting original design element of the bath house building was the interplay between historical references and contemporary material elements that conversed with each other. That interplay was completely lost with the demolition of the original bath house wings.

== See also ==
Glen Island Park
