= New Rochelle Harbor (Long Island Sound) =

Harbor in New Rochelle, New York, United States

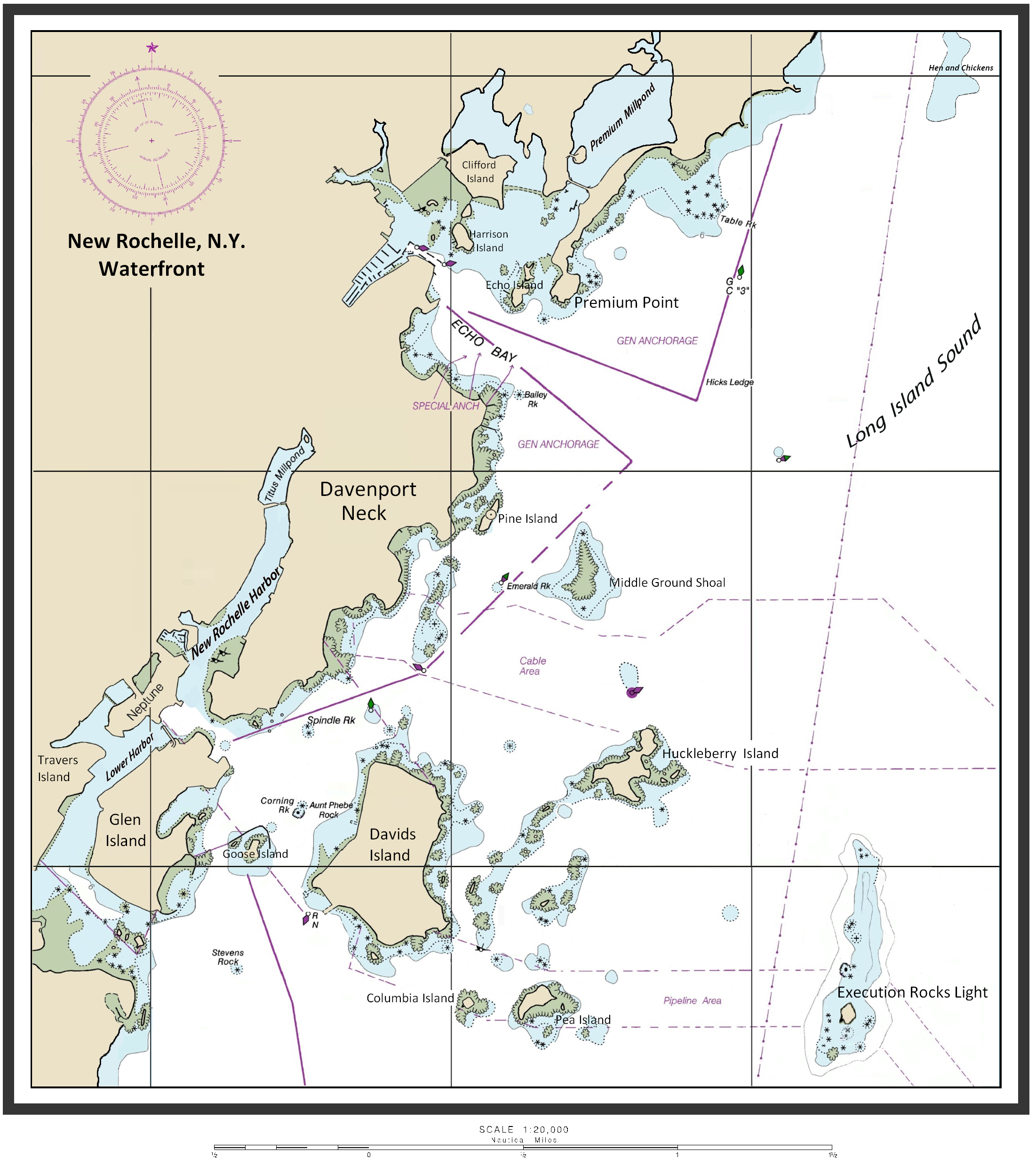

- Location within New York
- Location: New Rochelle, New York
- Coordinates: 40.8957°N 73.7768°W
- Islands: Travers, Neptune and Glen
- References: USGS - Geographic Names Information System

New Rochelle Harbor is the name of a harbor located along Long Island Sound in the city of New Rochelle in Westchester County, New York. The Davenport Neck peninsula off the mainland divides New Rochelle's waterfront into two bays; the westerly referred to as New Rochelle Harbor and the easterly as Echo Bay.

The upper portion the harbor lying behind Davenport’s Neck is known as "New Rochelle Creek". It extends in a northerly direction about a mile from the main entrance to the harbor east of Glen Island. Titus Mill-Pond is located at the northeastern end of the creek. The "Lower Harbor" is the long, narrow channel between Travers, Neptune and Glen islands. The entire harbor is protected from rough water and storms in Long Island Sound by Davenport Neck, Glen Island, and Hunters Island.

The Lower Harbor area is the site of a considerable amount of boating activity since it contains the mooring areas of the New York Athletic Club on Travers Island, and the Huguenot Yacht Club, and boatyards on the southerly half of Neptune Island. Also using the waters of the Lower Harbor are two boat launching ramps at Glen Island Park. The inner portion of the harbor is used by only a few boats, since most of its waters do not have sufficient depth.

The harbor has a length of about 6,500 feet and width of from 500 to 600 feet. The main entrance channel to the harbor lies between Davenport Neck and Glen Island. Access to the Lower Harbor from this entrance also involves passing under a bascule bridge connecting Glen Island to the mainland. Every time a boat enters or leaves the Lower Harbor, it requires the opening of the bridge, thus necessitating twenty-four-hour bridge tender staffing. A second entrance channel, between Glen Island and Hunters Island. Other channels exist between the several islands which lie on the Long Island Sound side of the harbor and protect the latter from easterly storms. Of these channels, one passes between Glen Island and Goose Island and another lies between Davids Island and Goose Island. The waters surrounding and in the immediate vicinity of these islands as well as the entrance channels are obstructed by numerous rocks.

The shoreline of New Rochelle Harbor contains a mix of recreational and marine commercial uses, and medium and high-density residential development. Recreational uses are predominant in the Lower Harbor, and include: Glen Island County Park, Glen Island Yacht Club, the New York Athletic Club Yacht Club, Huguenot Yacht Club. Additional marinas are arranged along the shoreline, with commercial and residential uses situated along Pelham Road in the upper harbor area.
