= Sutton Manor =

Sutton Manor may refer to:

- St John's Jerusalem, also known as Sutton Manor, Kent, UK
- Sutton Manor Colliery, Sutton, St Helens, Merseyside, UK
- Sutton Manor School, London, UK
- Sutton Manor (New Rochelle), a neighborhood in the city of New Rochelle, Westchester County, New York, US
