= Huckleberry Island =

Island in Long Island Sound

Coordinates: 40.88691°N 73.75766°W

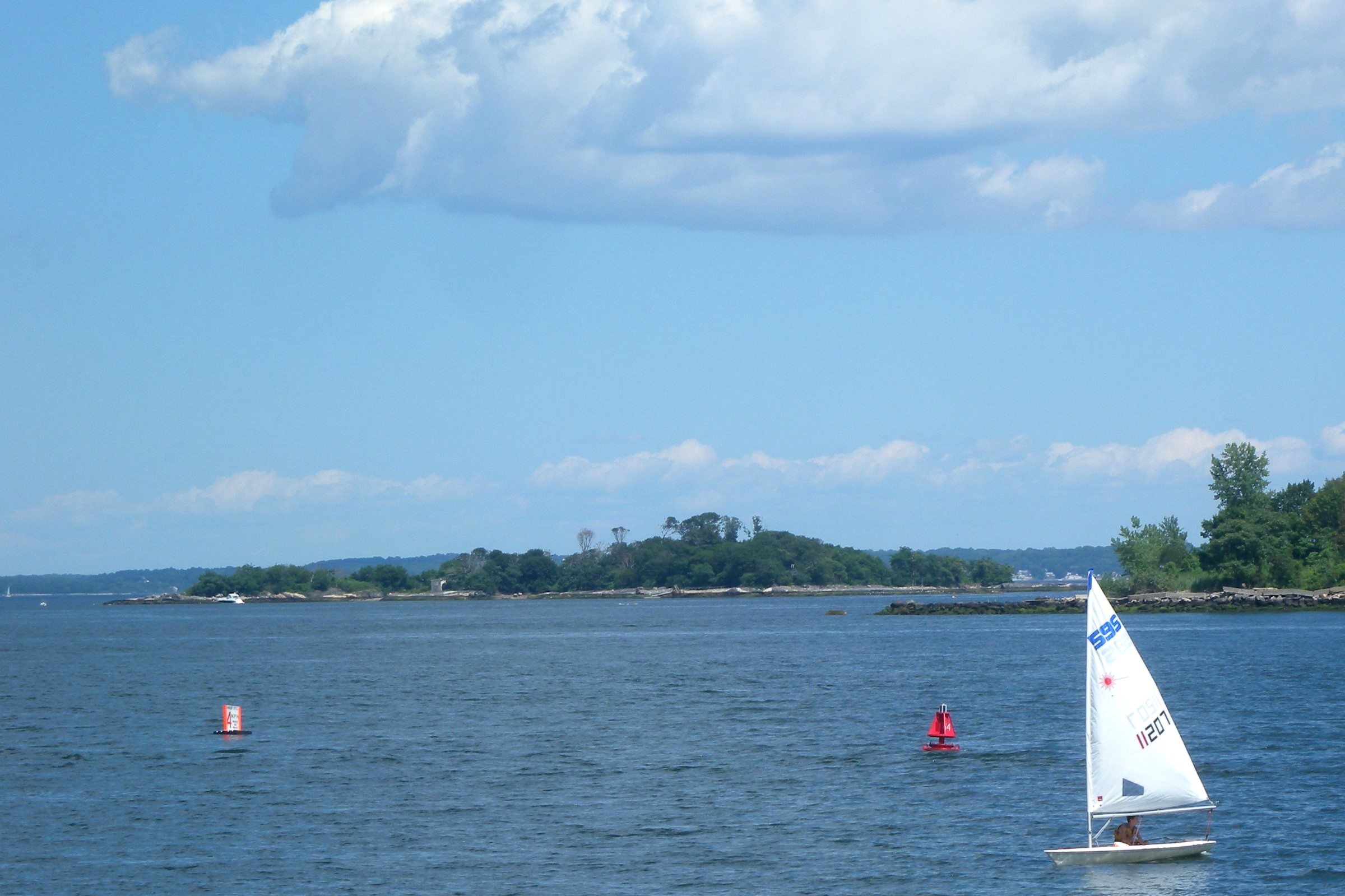
- Interactive map of Huckleberry Island

Geography
- Location: New Rochelle, New York; Long Island Sound

Administration
- United States

Huckleberry Island (or Whortleberry Island) is an island in Long Island Sound and part of New Rochelle, New York. It lies approximately three-fourths mile (1.2 km) east of Davids Island. The 10 acres (4.0 ha) island consists primarily of deciduous forest with virtually no shrubs or herbaceous growth under the canopy. The rocky shoreline supports a marine rocky intertidal community comprising one of the most southerly occurrences of this community type on the North Atlantic Coastline.

In the 19th century local tradition held that the island was the location of the buried treasure of Captain William Kidd, one of the best known pirates in history.

== Environmental importance ==
Huckleberry Island provides an undisturbed upland environment for wildlife that is rare in coastal portions of the New York City metropolitan area. The primary significance of the island is its use for nesting by large numbers of colonial waterbirds such as egrets and night herons. In addition to the heron and cormorant populations, Huckleberry Island has significant nesting colonies of herring gull and great black-backed gull. In 1987, an estimated 1000 nesting herring gulls and 400 nesting great black-backed gulls were observed here. The great egrets and snowy egrets tend to nest in the tops of densely crowned trees. Black-crowned night herons appear to nest in the lower extent of the forest canopy and double-crested cormorants nest in either the upper branches of small trees along the forest edge or at the tops of the larger trees. Most of the gulls nested near the edge of the rocks along the island's perimeter (mostly at the north end). Other possible nesting birds include green heron and little blue heron.

This island is listed in the National Audubon Society 2002 Open Space Conservation Plan as a priority site under the project name Westchester Marine Corridor. Cormorant droppings have been killing many trees at this site, making them unsuitable for nesting by herons and egrets. There is some concern that the non-native Norway maple understory may eventually replace the native hardwood trees.

== Links ==
- NYC Audubon Harbor Herons Project
- Satellite view of Huckleberry Island
