= Fort Slocum =

United States Army fortress in the U.S. state of New York

- Part of Coast Defenses of Eastern New York
- Davids Island, city of New Rochelle, New York
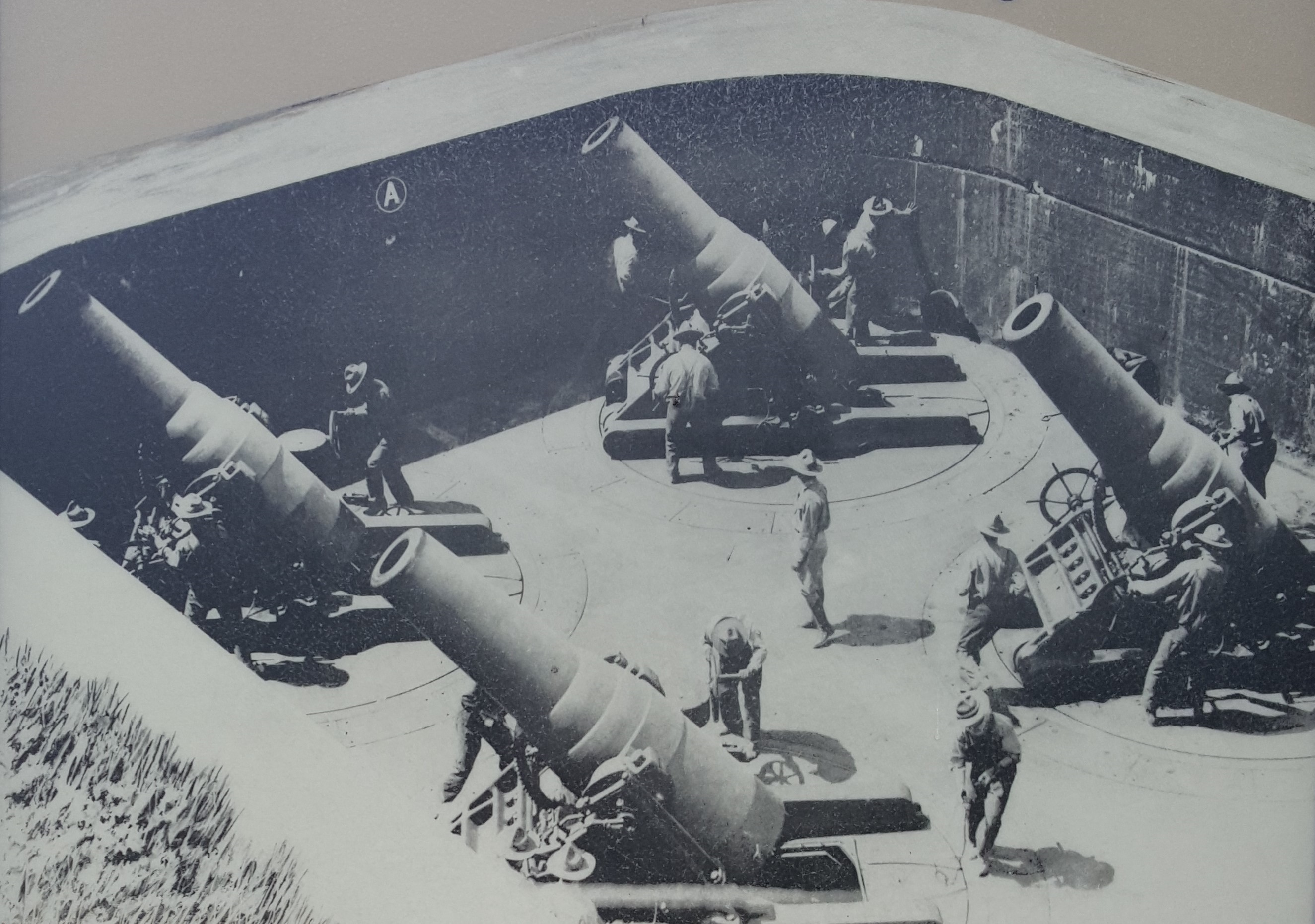
- Mortars similar to the type used at Fort Slocum

Site information
- Type: Coastal defense fort, hospital, training base
- Owner: City of New Rochelle
- Condition: Demolished

Location
- Location in New York City area Fort Slocum (New York) Fort Slocum (the United States)
- Coordinates: 40°53′02″N 73°46′12″W

Site history
- Built: 1862
- Built by: United States Army Corps of Engineers
- In use: 1867–1965
- Demolished: 2008
- Battles/wars: American Civil War; World War I World War II

Fort Slocum, New York was a US military post which occupied Davids Island in the western end of Long Island Sound in the city of New Rochelle, New York, from 1867 to 1965. The fort was named for Major General Henry W. Slocum, a Union corps commander in the American Civil War.

== History ==
=== Civil War ===
Military use of the island dates from 1861, when the 3rd Regiment (63rd New York Infantry) of the Irish Brigade established Camp Carrigan. In 1862, Davids Island was leased by the U.S. Government. This marked the first use of Davids Island by the Regular Army. At that time, De Camp General Hospital (named for Dr. Samuel G. I. de Camp) was established to serve thousands of wounded individuals from the battlefields of the American Civil War. By late 1862, De Camp was the Army's largest general hospital, housing more than 2,100 patients.

Originally, De Camp General Hospital treated only Union soldiers, but following the Battle of Gettysburg in July 1863, the War Department opened it to care for hundreds of wounded Confederate soldiers. Even though a prison camp had been established on Hart Island in 1865, Davids Island soon held more than 2,500 Confederate prisoners of war. Most had recovered by October, and they were moved to prisoner-of-war camps elsewhere. A ferry connection was established during the war from Neptune Island, under the control of Simeon Leland.

=== Post Civil War ===
At the end of the war, Congress authorized the island's purchase for military purposes and it was conveyed to the United States as the Davids Island Military Reservation in 1867. From this date, the Federal government operated its own ferry to and from Neptune Island. In July 1878 Davids Island was made a principal depot of the U.S. Army General Recruiting Service, taking over this assignment from Governors Island. This marked the beginning of the installation's longstanding mission as a recruitment and training center.

=== Late 19th century through 1916 ===
As the post on Davids Island grew, in the 1880s the Army invested in new brick construction of more than 20 new buildings, including officers' quarters, enlisted men's barracks, mess halls, hospital buildings, and support facilities. It was later converted to a coastal artillery defense post and was eventually given the name Fort Slocum after Major General Henry W. Slocum, U.S. Volunteers in 1896. Construction of fortifications on the island resulted from the recommendations of the Endicott Board of Fortifications, an 1885 study of America's coastal defenses. The study called for better protection of ports such as New York Harbor, and Davids Island became part of its system of defenses.

Between 1891 and 1904, artillery batteries were erected at three places on the eastern half of the island: Battery Practice near the southeastern shoreline, with 1870s-era weapons for training personnel for older forts, the state-of-the-art Abbot Quad heavy mortar batteries, Haskin and Overton, mounting a total of 16 breech-loading 12-inch mortars, at the southeast end of the island; and two adjoining medium-range breech-loading rifled gun batteries, Fraser and Kinney, on the northeastern shore.

Battery Practice had at least one 15-inch smoothbore Rodman gun and two 8-inch converted rifles, all muzzle-loading and typical of weapons emplaced in the 1870s. It was disestablished in 1899, although the 15-inch gun remains on the island. Battery Kinney had two 6-inch M1900 guns on pedestal mounts, and Battery Fraser had two 5-inch M1900 guns on pedestal mounts. (Despite the presence of mis-captioned postcards, including those in the New Rochelle Public Library, there were never large-caliber breech-loading disappearing guns placed at Davids Island.)

Battery Haskin was named for Joseph A. Haskin, a general who served in the Mexican War and Civil War, whose son, Major William L. Haskin, commanded Davids Island 1894–1896. Battery Overton was named for Captain Clough Overton, a cavalry officer in the Spanish–American War. Battery Kinney was named for Joseph Kinney, an officer killed in the War of 1812, and Battery Fraser was named for Upton S. Fraser, an officer killed by the Seminoles in 1835.

With improved dreadnought battleships and the construction of the Coast Defenses of Long Island Sound at the beginning of the 20th century, these batteries became obsolete, and Ft. Slocum was removed in 1907 from the Artillery District of New York (Coast Defenses of Eastern New York from 1913), leaving Fort Totten and Fort Schuyler in that role until 1935. However, Fort Slocum retained all its guns until World War I. At the start of the 20th Century Davids Island became the East Coast assembly point for units assigned to America's new overseas territories.

=== World War I ===
After the American entry into World War I Fort Slocum became one of the busiest recruit training stations in the country, processing 100,000 soldiers per year and serving as the recruit examination station for soldiers from New York, New Jersey, Pennsylvania and the New England states. Between 1917 and 1919, over 140,000 recruits passed through the post. Recruit Week in December 1917 brought so many recruits to Fort Slocum that an overflow had to be housed in New Rochelle.

Fort Slocum's guns were dismounted and transferred to other uses beginning in 1917. Battery Kinney's 6-inch guns were moved to Fort Tilden. Battery Fraser's 5-inch guns were dismounted, probably for potential service on field carriages on the Western Front. Records do not indicate if these guns were sent to France. In 1919 Fort Slocum was totally disarmed. Its 16 mortars were removed and possibly became railway artillery.

=== Between the wars ===
In 1922 there was a general military drawdown, and closure of Fort Slocum was proposed. It remained open with varying roles. It housed at least one US Olympic Team, a Civilian Conservation Corps camp, and the Army cooks' and bakers' school. The 1884 water tower was replaced in 1929, and a sewage system was installed. In the 1930s most of the coast defense batteries were demolished to make room for three new barracks, the Trivium.

=== World War II ===
On 16 May 1941, as war raged in Europe, Fort Slocum became part of the New York Port of Embarkation, becoming a staging area for troops moving overseas. Fort Slocum also trained cadre to set up other staging areas in Greater New York, such as Camp Kilmer and Camp Shanks in 1941 and 1942. Fort Slocum hosted the Atlantic Coast Transportation Officers' Training School, acquainting former civilians from the transportation industries with the Army. The fort was a key element of the Army's Transportation Corps, so named in mid-1942, whose mission was moving huge numbers of men and amounts of materiel overseas.

By early 1944 the need to ship troops to Europe had lessened, and a policy of rotating troops in the US who hadn't seen action to overseas battlefields and the reverse was instituted. Battle-hardened soldiers returning from Europe were put through a "Provisional Training Center" at Fort Slocum to re-acquaint them with the stateside Army, with its surplus of proper military appearance, courtesy, and discipline, along with its deficit of shooting. In May 1944 Private Willie Lee Duckworth of Sandersville, Georgia devised the famous "Sound off, one, two" military cadence while attending one of these classes. In November 1944, as the transportation school wound down, Fort Slocum took on a mission of rehabilitating soldiers who had been court-martialed in Europe and sent home.

=== Late 1940s ===
Following World War II, Fort Slocum was briefly considered as a nuclear research center; what became Brookhaven National Laboratory was chosen instead. From 1946 to 1949, Fort Slocum housed Headquarters First Air Force. It was renamed Slocum Air Force Base in June 1949; this only lasted for a year before being turned back into an Army post in June 1950. From 1955 to 1960, Fort Slocum housed part of Nike Ajax air-defense missile battery NY-15. The missiles were stored on launch rails and in underground bunkers on nearby Hart Island, with the radar and control base situated on Davids' Island. In July 1960, after only five years of operation, Nike Battery NY-15 was closed.

=== 1950-1965 ===
From 1951 to 1962, Fort Slocum was the home of the U.S. Army Chaplain School. From 1951 to 1954, Fort Slocum was home to the joint services Armed Forces Information School. From 1954, this was truncated to the Army Information School; from 1964, this was again reorganized into the joint services Defense Information School, which was later transferred to Fort Benjamin Harrison, Indiana, and then to its current home at Fort Meade, Maryland. Over the course of this time, troops from the various services, officers and enlisted, male and female, American and allied, were trained in applied journalism, oral communication, radio/TV broadcasting, public and world affairs, and photography. In 1965, the information school was moved to Fort Benjamin Harrison, Indiana when Fort Slocum was deactivated.

=== After closure ===
Fort Slocum was deactivated on November 30, 1965. During the decades that followed, the facilities of the former Army post were neglected and deteriorated severely and continued to occupy Davids Island into the beginning of the 21st century. The ruins were among the factors complicating redevelopment of the island. Beginning in 2004, however, Congress appropriated funds to remove the ruins through a Defense Department program that assists communities in reusing former defense facilities. During the summer of 2008, the city of New Rochelle demolished all remaining structures on the island, including the iconic water tower on the northern end of the island, with plans to turn the island into a park.

=== "Sound off, one, two" ===
The famous "Sound off, one, two" military cadence was invented at Fort Slocum in May 1944, attributed to Private Willie Lee Duckworth of Sandersville, Georgia.

=== Other uses of the name ===
Fort Slocum was also the name of a Civil War fort in the Defenses of Washington, D.C., although it was named for a different Slocum (Colonel John S. Slocum of Rhode Island, killed at the First Battle of Bull Run). The Library of Congress web site contains two photographs titled Officers, 4th U.S. Colored Infantry, Fort Slocum, April, 1865. Since that regiment was never stationed north of Baltimore, Maryland, it is likely that the Fort Slocum referred to was the one in Washington, D.C.

== Gallery ==
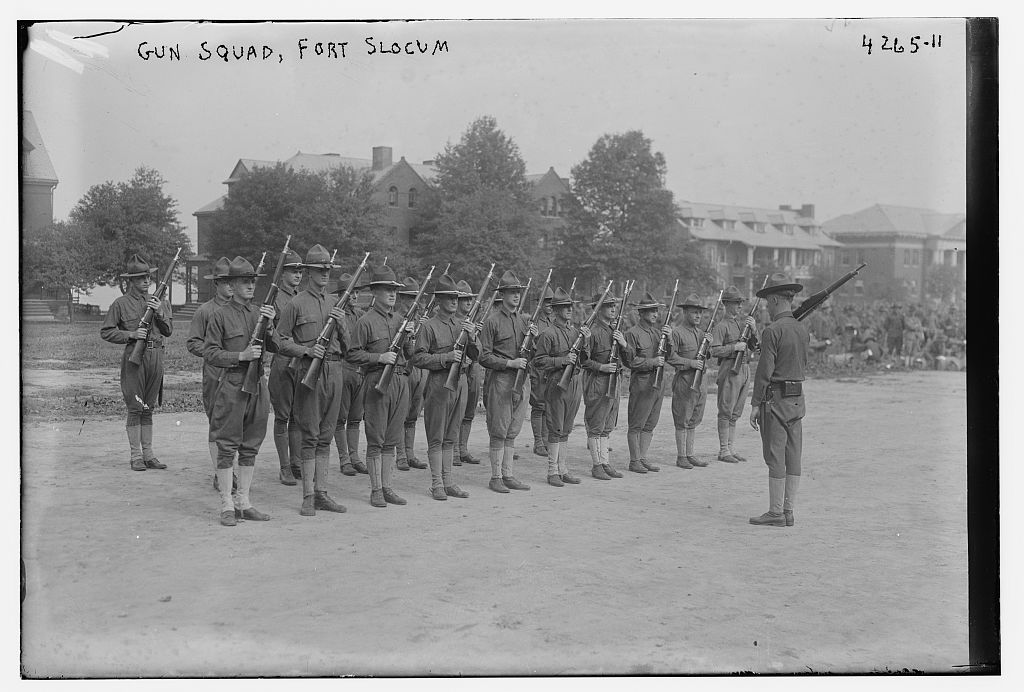
Rifle squad

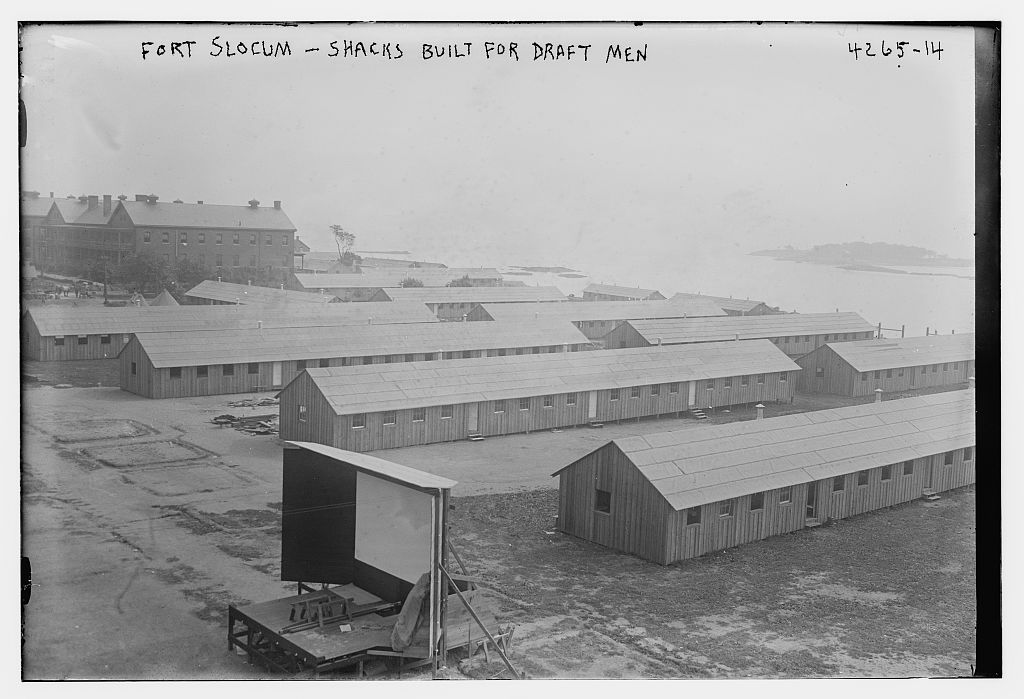
early barracks

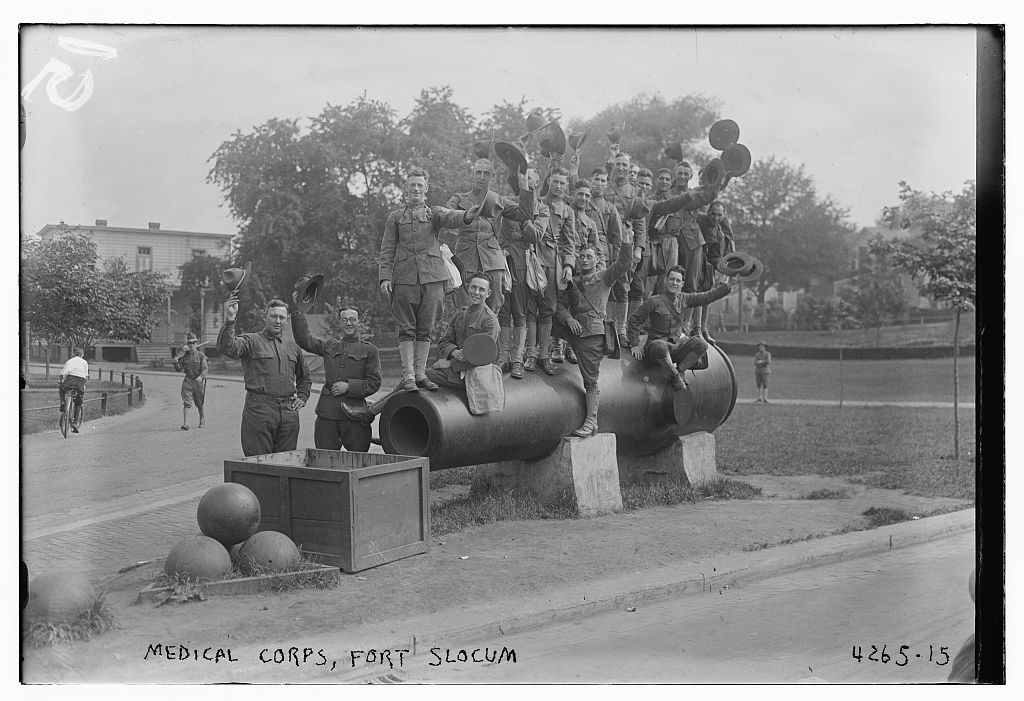
Medical corps posing on 15-inch Rodman gun

== See also ==
- Davids Island (New York)
- Hart Island, New York
- List of Civil War POW prisons and camps
- Seacoast defense in the United States
- United States Army Coast Artillery Corps
