= Short Beach Island =

Island in New Jersey, US

Coordinates: 39.471°N 74.320°W

Short Beach Island, Short Beach or Tucker's Island was a barrier island located on the Jersey Shore of the Atlantic Ocean. Little Beach is a remnant of Short Beach; the northern remnant was encroached upon and attached to Long Beach Island before succumbing to erosion.

== Geography ==
Short Beach was located southwest of Long Beach Island and northeast of Brigantine Island.

== History ==
Short Beach first appears as a named feature on the 1777 map of New Jersey by William Faden, where it is labeled as a part of Brigantine Beach called Mihannon Shoal. Short Beach Island and its demise was described in 1878, viz.,

Short Beach, also known as Tucker's Beach, formerly was on the south side of Little Egg Harbor (old) Inlet, and was probably, a hundred years ago, six or eight miles long.

It is now about a mile long. Tradition affirms that in the year 1800 an inlet broke through a wooded and swampy portion of this beach in a severe storm in the night, which in a few years enlarged to a navigable size. This is now the "New Inlet," and is the only navigable inlet to Little Egg Harbor and Great Bays and the waters adjacent. The portion of beach thus separated from Short Beach has since been known as Little Beach, and lies between the present inlet and Brigantine Inlet. The old inlet, once the best along the coast, is said to have been from one to two miles wide, as recently as 1848, and was navigable for the smaller-sized coasters until within ten or twelve years. It closed entirely in 1874, so that persons walked across from Short to Long Beach with dry feet.

The two beaches are now united as one.

In time, the northern remnant of Short Beach came to be known as Tucker's Island.

The Annual Report of the New Jersey State Geologist for 1905 addressed and described the dynamic of the opening and closing of inlets in the Little Egg Harbor area:

The birth of "New Inlet" is ascribed to the closing of Brigantine Inlet, prior to 1800, and to the gradual reduction in size of the Old Inlet, by the growth of the spit southward, so that for a time the enlargement of New Inlet compensated for the loss of capacity in the former openings. Between 1800 when New Inlet opened and 1874 when the "Old Inlet" (Little Egg) had so far closed that "people walked across it," there were two openings as shown on the chart of 1840, each a mile wide with Tucker's Island, two miles long, lying between them. As the northern opening closed the southern half of the Island was cut away so that this southern opening became two miles wide in 1870. Soon after this date the outer or Long Beach, which had been growing parallel to Tucker's Island, effected a junction with its remaining half, formed a typical hook, and closed completely the "Old Inlet" converting the island into a peninsula.

The inner middle ground, known as Anchorage Island, nearly 1½ miles long and ½ a mile wide in 1840, has worn away until it is a mere speck on the chart of 1904. In 1878 New Inlet was at its best, but it is now shoaling. In 1803 vessels drawing from 15 to 18 feet entered this harbor at high water. These changes were affected also by changes at Brigantine Inlet, which was reported to have closed before 1800, again opened (in latitude 39º 27') before 1840 and afterword to have drifted southward ½ mile in 30 years, or at the rate of 88 feet per annum. During this time period (1840-1870) great changes took place in length and position of "Short" or "Brigantine" Beach, the coast of which, between New and Brigantine inlets was swung to the southwest-by-south and elongated at both ends, but, since 1870, it has lost these accretions and the existing coast line of 1904 is again so modified as to be hardly recognizable. The anchor-shaped island which has formed to the east of Brigantine Beach is suggestive as to the direction of the prevailing forces, having the flukes thrown back parallel to the shank, and all lying in a southwest course. The survey of 1904 also shows a material reduction in the width and direction of New Inlet, due to the extensive shoal covering the site of Grassy Channel and reaching as far as to the former Anchorage Island, thus changing the direction of the main currents through the inlet and causing the bar channels to shift.

The growth of the southerly point of "Long Beach" up to 1904 has caused it to overlap the entire length of Tucker's Island and to reach to within three-fourths of a mile of Brigantine Beach, thus congesting the tidal movements. It has filled in at points where the depth was 50 feet, so that the solid earth is above the surface and the resort known as "Sea Haven" is now laid out across a former navigable channel.

A lighthouse was established on Tucker's Island in 1848. Unmanned, this facility was closed in 1860. After the close of the American Civil War, the manned Little Egg Harbor Lighthouse was activated. This remained in operation until 1927, when erosion rendered the structure unsafe. A United States Life-Saving Service station was established on the island in 1856, and was in operation until the early 1930s, when it, too, became unsafe due to erosion.

In the late nineteenth century, an attempt was made at the development of a seaside resort known as Sea Haven. Two hotels were constructed, which enjoyed some success for several years until competition from more accessible resorts drew business away. In 1907 another attempt at development, St. Albans by the Sea, was attempted, but was not successful.

By the 1920s, Beach Haven Inlet had opened, which once again severed Tucker's Island from Long Beach Island, and increased erosion to an alarming rate. By 1927 the lighthouse was undermined to the point where it had to be abandoned; it collapsed into the ocean on October 12 of that year. The Life Saving station followed in the early 1930s. The island had completely disappeared by 1950.

An ephemeral, intertidal island labeled on modern nautical charts as Tucker's Island has emerged in recent years at the approximate former location.
