= Sutton Manor (New Rochelle) =

American residential district developed 1904

Coordinates: 40.911°N 73.772°W

- Neighborhood
- Interactive map of Sutton Manor
- Country: United States
- State: New York
- County: Westchester
- City: New Rochelle
- Time zone: UTC-5:00 (Eastern)
  - Summer (DST): UTC-4:00 (Eastern)
- Area code: 914

Sutton Manor is a distinctive early 20th century suburban residential district in the city of New Rochelle in Westchester County, New York. The neighborhood is located off the northern shore of Long Island Sound on Echo Bay. It was developed as an upper middle class enclave for families with heads of households employed in New York City and served as a model for the ideal suburban setting; harmonious architecture and exclusive amenities. The development appears to have been modeled on neighboring Larchmont Manor in the Town of Mamaroneck, yet on a smaller scale. That subdivision was conceived originally as an exclusive and convenient seasonal playground for New York’s wealthy upper classes, with its 6-acre waterfront park.

In 2008, a New York State Certified Local Government grant allowed the 'Historical and Landmarks Review Board' to hire an historic preservation firm to conduct extensive research on the historic and architectural significance of Sutton Manor. For both its physical attributes and social aspects, Sutton Manor is a significant historic resource for the community and deserving of its protection through designation as a local historic district under the city code. Although not currently listed on the National Register of Historic Places, Sutton Manor meets all of the criteria and is clearly eligible for designation.

== Development ==
At the turn of the 18th century, most of the waterfront acreage in the northeast section of New Rochelle was owned by one of its original settlers, Huguenot Louis Guion. Another of the French refugees, Alexander Allaire, purchased much of it in 1748.

The lands eventually came into the hands of James Pitcher, Commissary of Musters in the British Army, who owned it until the outbreak of the Revolutionary War. For some unknown reason his property was not confiscated and he was able to leave it to his nephew, Thomas Huntington.

The portion of the property that is now Sutton Manor, came into the possession of Thaddeus Davids in the late 1830s. At the time, Davids was the head of one of the largest ink companies in the country.

He built a country home in the middle of the parcel, naming it "Echo Place" to reflect its frontage on Echo Bay. He also bought an island off New Rochelle’s southern shore, now known as Davids Island. Davids had a large family of 12 children born to 3 different wives. His second son, George W. Davids, eventually brought the family business to ruin. The company and Thaddeus Davids, individually, were forced to dispose of all assets, which resulted in the 1884 sale of Echo Place to George W. Sutton to be enjoyed as a country retreat by his family.

After Sutton’s death in 1894, the property was rented out until his heirs decided to develop the property. In 1904, George W. Sutton, Jr. formed the 'Sutton Manor Realty Company', selecting civil engineer and architect Lawrence E. Van Etten to draw up the subdivision plan of 50 home sites for the property. Van Etten designed about 100 subdivisions in Westchester County between 1890 and 1950, as well as several golf courses including the Wykagyl Country Club here and Pelham Country Club in Elmsford.

== Architecture ==
Sutton Manor exemplifies an upper middle class enclave, attractive to professionals desirous of tasteful surroundings. The vast majority of houses that comprise the neighborhood are essentially intact to their initial construction dates. Sutton Manor retains its original plan and amenities, while the architecture of the homes exhibit the array of stylistic choices available during the 1904 – 1927 time frame, primarily Colonial Revival, Craftsman, Tudor Revival, Mediterranean, Bungalow, and Art Moderne. Many of them are early examples of styles that were just being introduced. Three of the dwellings predate the neighborhoods development and are associated with the Thaddeus Davids property, "Echo Place", thus physically linking the community to an even earlier period. It was a subdivision that served as a model for the "ideal suburban setting" — harmonious architecture and exclusive amenities.

Adding to the significance of this collection of early 20th century houses they include the work of nationally prominent architect John Russell Pope, in addition to New York architects and builders including Chester A. Patterson, William Liance Cottrell and Charles Lupprian.

== Residents ==
With its proximity to New York City, many of the Manor's residents were involved in activities of regional, statewide and national significance, which instigated frequent mention of the "exclusive Sutton Manor" in The New York Times.

Beginning with Thaddeus Davids, an important ink manufacturer from before the Civil War and for whom Davids Island is named, the property has been home to important financiers, bankers, attorneys, industrialists, inventors, engineers, politicians, public servants, artists of every ilk, actors, and other notable figures. Well known yachtsmen, boat designers and enthusiasts made Sutton Manor home as well.

Notable former residents include: Rowland Hughes, Director of the U.S. Office of Management and Budget; Lee Parsons Davis, New York State Supreme Court Justice and District Attorney of Westchester County; prominent early Twentieth Century American artist Coles Phillips; Tony Award-winning actress Frances Sternhagen; and actor Thomas Carlin.

== Sources ==
- "New Rochelle The City of Huguenots";1926, The Knickerbocker Press, New Rochelle, NY
- "The Cruising Guide to the New England Coast"; Robert C. Duncan, W. Wallace Fenn
- "Westchester County: the past hundred years, 1883-1983"; Marilyn E. Weigold, Westchester Historical Society
