= Lanes Island =

Lanes Island is a small uninhabited island on the south fork of Suffolk County on Long Island, New York. It is part of the Town of Southampton.

== Geography ==
Lanes Island is located at 40°50′6″N 72°31′12″W (40.835134, -72.520061).
