= Columbia Island (New York) =

Island in the Long Island Sound

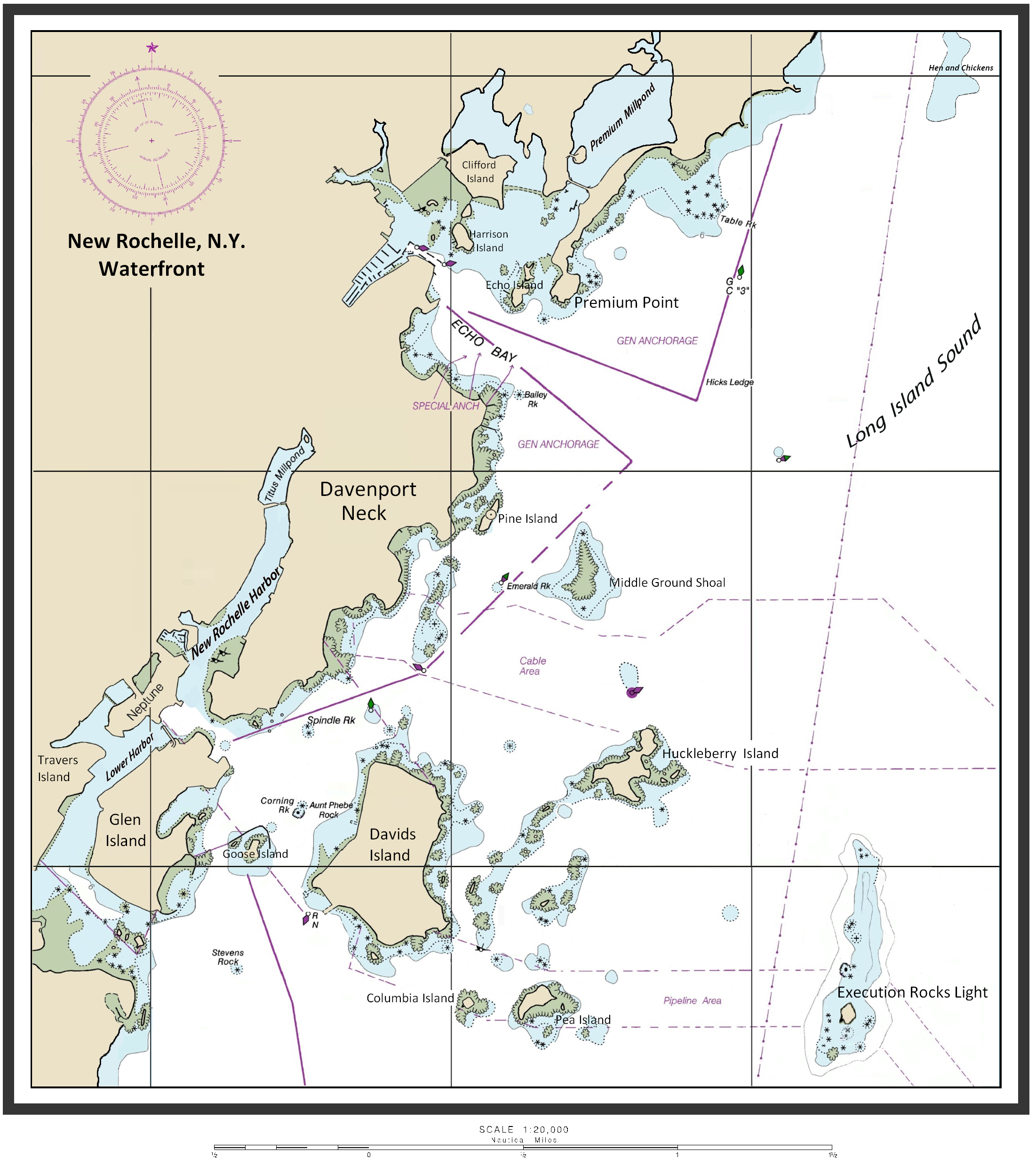
- Interactive map of Columbia Island

Geography
- Location: Long Island Sound
- Coordinates: 40.877322°N 73.762354°W
- Area: 2 acres (0.81 ha)

Administration
- United States
- State: New York
- County: Westchester
- City: New Rochelle

Demographics
- Population: 0
- Pop. density: 0/km^{2} (0/sq mi)

Columbia Island (formerly Little Pea Island), is an island in the Long Island Sound and part of New Rochelle, New York, United States. It is situated off the south-eastern coast of Davids Island, immediately adjacent to Pea Island. Before sea walls and other structures were built on the island, the exposed rock varied in size from about one acre to 175 square feet depending on the tide.

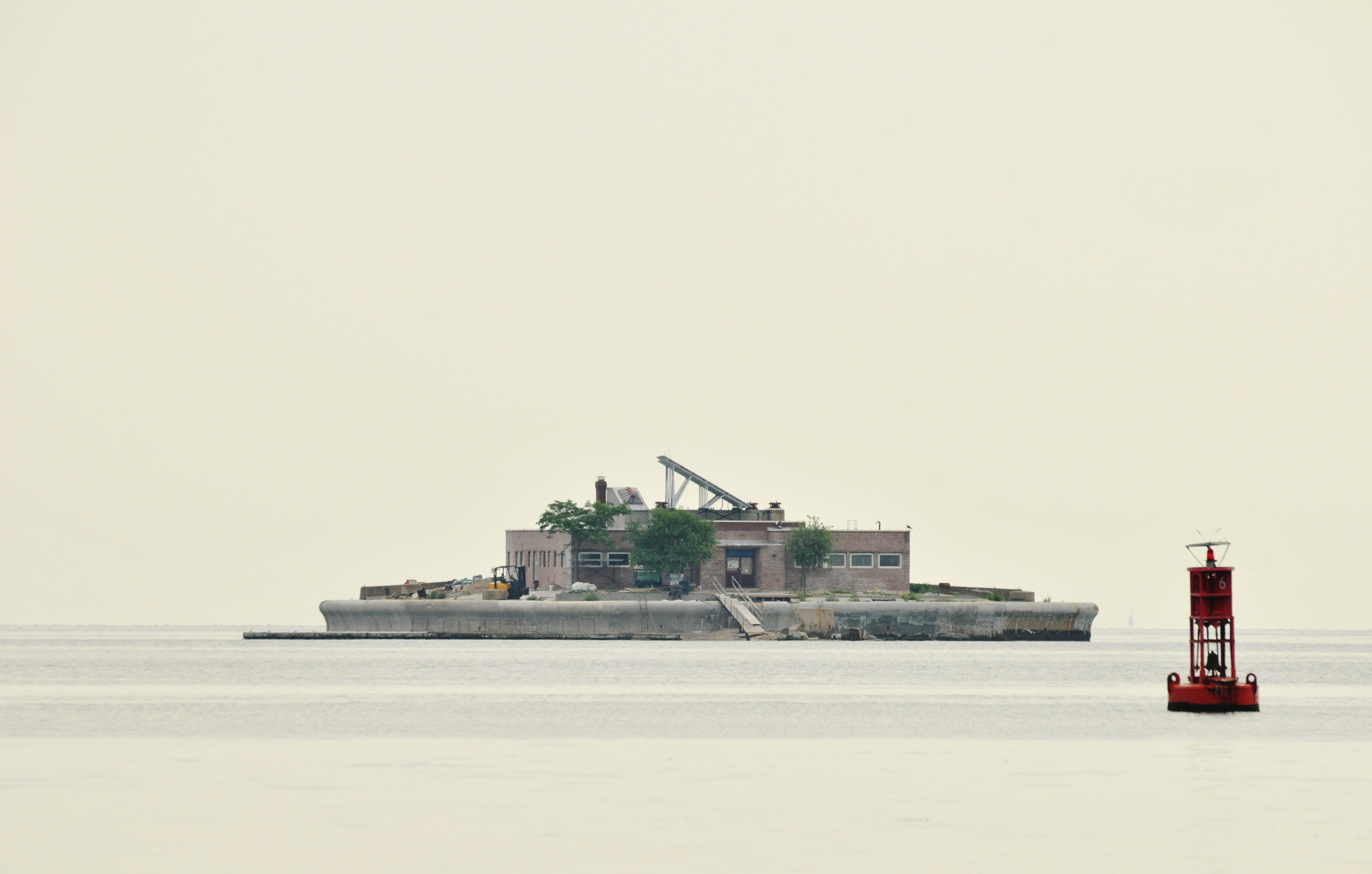
View of the island from Pelham Bay Park (2014)

It was once owned by the Iselin family who sold it to the Huguenot Yacht Club along with Pea Island in 1936. Three years later, the club sold Little Pea Island to the Columbia Broadcasting System, which appropriately renamed it "Columbia". As a result of engineering surveys designating the area around New Rochelle and Port Washington on Long Island Sound as the ideal locality for a radio transmitter to serve the metropolitan New York area, new stations were constructed on these sites by both the Columbia ("CBS") and National ("NBC") broadcasting systems in 1940. CBS purchased the island as the site for a new broadcast antenna tower for WCBS (then known by the call sign WABC).

CBS spent approximately $500,000 to construct the transmitter building with emergency housing for ten workers, and the 410-foot (125 m) broadcast tower. The station contained a 50,000-watt transmitter housed in a 75-square-foot (7.0 m^{2}) copper-walled building. There also was a 5,000-watt transmitter unit for emergency use. Electric power was supplied through two submarine cables, which were connected to separate power plants to prevent interruption of service. Emergency generators were installed on the island for protection against power failure. The men who operated the station lived within a grounded metal shell under which were living quarters for engineers, workshops, electrical units that supplied tube voltages, and the backup generator. The transmitter remained in operation until 1963, when it became obsolete, and the station was moved to nearby High Island.

CBS's work to build a high-power broadcasting station included drilling through bedrock to a source of fresh water, found at a depth of 910 feet (280 m).

The island was then purchased by the show-business couple Peter Lind Hayes and Mary Healy, who broadcast a breakfast conversation show from their home there. It was part of a package that included a strip of waterfront property, a speedboat, and a tugboat. The couple later gave the island to the College of New Rochelle. In 2005, the then-current owner of the island sought to demolish the old transmitter building and replace it with a private residence.

Pathologist Al Sutton bought Columbia Island in 2007. To make the island more livable, he constructed an off-the-grid "green" home within the concrete building with solar panels. In June 2019, Columbia Island and nearby Pea Island were jointly put on sale with a list price of $13 million. According to The New York Times, Sutton described the property as a "money pit", constantly needed more money to maintain. Sutton spent $8 million on the property.
