= Neptune Island (Long Island Sound) =

Island in the Long Island Sound, New York, U.S.

Coordinates: 40°53′25″N 73°46′58″W

Neptune
- Interactive map of Neptune

Geography
- Location: New Rochelle, New York; Long Island Sound
- Total islands: 1

Administration
- United States
- State: New York
- County: Westchester
- City: New Rochelle

Neptune Island is an island in Long Island Sound and part of the City of New Rochelle, New York. It is connected to the mainland by a stone causeway topped by Neptune Road. A dam at the peninsula's east end creates a small pond, and its west shore edges the Neptune Basin inlet.

== History ==
The island was originally included in the commons of the Town and, following the end of the American Revolution, it came under the ownership of Anthony Lispenard Bleecker. In 1828, it was purchased by William Turpin, who named it Moses Island. It was during Turpin's ownership that the present road and causeway were built, connecting the island with the mainland, and a steamboat dock was built at the end of that road.

In 1837, Isaac Underhill and his wife Deborah built the Neptune House summer resort hotel. The large white frame structure located in the center of the wooded island became so popular that the island was later named after it. Some of the early steamboats that shuttled individuals between New Rochelle and New York City from the Neptune House Dock were the American Eagle, Croton, Economy, and Island City. In 1876, the Neptune House was also the terminal of Colonel DeLancey Kane's Tally Ho coach running daily between New Rochelle and the Brunswick Hotel in New York City.

The Underhill family owned the island through 1885, they sold it to Adrian G Iselin, who demolished most of the hotel. Iselin soon established the New Rochelle and Pelham Railroad Company and the New Rochelle Street Railway Company, making a connection to Neptune Island and the Glen Island ferry from the New Rochelle railroad depot. Along with the private steamboats operated to the island from New York City by Mr. Starin, the two companies greatly facilitated travel to and from the island by way of the New York and New Haven Railroad.

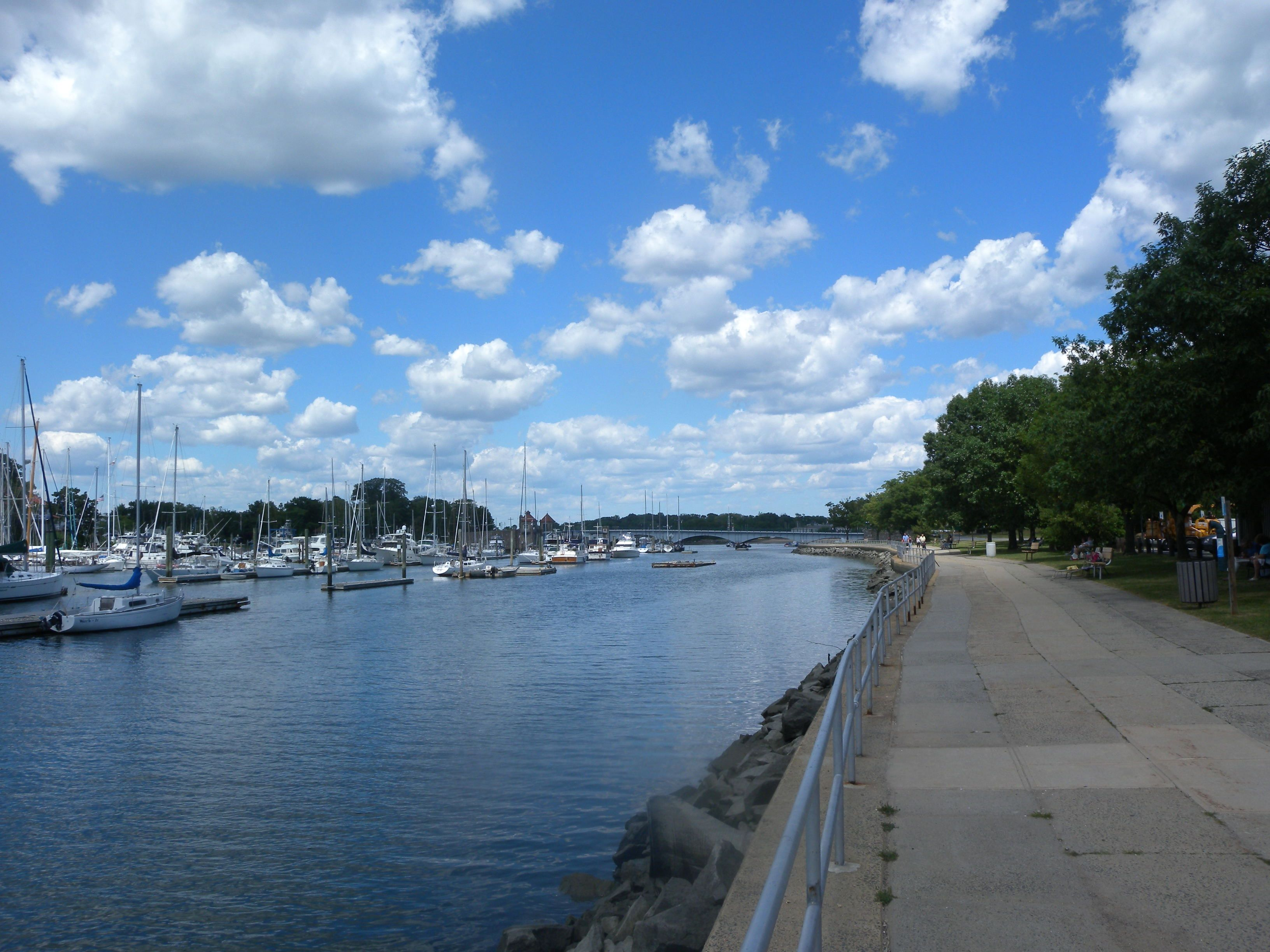
Marina at Neptune Island

One section of the original hotel was left standing, and it was divided into four private houses that still remain at 1,2,3, and 4 Harbor Lane. Mr. Iselin later donated a large section of the island to the City of New Rochelle for a park. The Huguenot Yacht Club now occupies the western end of the island, and the ferry between Neptune and Glen Islands has been replaced by a large bascule bridge extending from the mainland, over the western end of Neptune Island, to Glen Island.

== See also ==
- Davids Island (New York)
- New York islands
