= Little Egg Inlet =

Coordinates: 39°29′53″N 74°19′03″W

Little Egg Inlet is an inlet connecting the Atlantic Ocean and the Great Bay along the southeastern coast of New Jersey, United States. Little Egg Inlet forms a maritime border separating Little Egg Harbor Township in southern Ocean County and Galloway Township in northeastern Atlantic County.

On the morning of August 28, 2011, Tropical Storm Irene made its second U.S. landfall at Brigantine, though initial reports placed it at Little Egg Inlet. At the time it was believed to be the first hurricane to make landfall in New Jersey since 1903, but later analysis by the National Hurricane Center determined that the storm had weakened to tropical storm status by the time it made its second landfall.

On March 3, 2017, the United States Coast Guard has temporarily closed the inlet due to serve shoaling and had removed six out of seven buoys, they had reported that their ship couldn't reach the seventh buoy and had left it there. They have no plan date to put the buoys back. The United States Coast Guard has reported to use the inlet "at your own risk".

As of 2018 the Little Egg Inlet has been dredged, and the buoys replaced.
