= Glen Island Park =

Park in Westchester County, New York, United States

Glen Island
- Interactive map of Glen Island

Geography
- Location: Long Island Sound
- Coordinates: 40.8852°N 73.7838°W
- Total islands: 5 islands
- Area: 105 acres (42 ha)

Administration
- United States
- State: New York
- County: Westchester County
- City: New Rochelle

Glen Island Park is a 105-acre (0.42 km^{2}) waterfront park, located on Glen Island, on the Long Island Sound, New York. The park is owned and operated by Westchester County and shares the island with a privately operated but county-owned entertainment facility, the Glen Island Harbour Club (formerly the Glen Island Casino). The Glen Island Casino was a springboard to success during the 1930s Big Band Era, including that of Ozzie Nelson, Charlie Barnet, Claude Thornhill, Les Brown, The Dorsey Brothers and Glenn Miller. Westchester County residency is required for parking and beach access.

The island is situated between Davids, Neptune, and Travers islands in New Rochelle, and Hunter Island in nearby Pelham Bay Park, in the Bronx borough of New York City. Although now one island, the site originally consisted of one large main island in close proximity to at least four smaller nearby islands, a number of rocky outcroppings, low-lying flats, and salt marshes. The island includes remnants of some of the historic structures of Starin's Resort.

Starin's Glen Island was a summer resort on the island in the community of New Rochelle, developed by shipping magnate and U.S. Congressman John H. Starin in the late 19th century. Starin's resort, referred to as "America's pleasure grounds" was the first theme park in the country. The park's original design exhibited the five cultures of the western world on individual islands linked together with piers and causeways. The extreme popularity of the park resulted in a building boom in New Rochelle in the first decade of the twentieth century.

== History ==
In 1879, former U.S. Congressman John H. Starin bought Glen Island and four nearby islands. He gave Glen Island its name and converted the islands into Starin's Glen Island, a summer resort for city dwellers that has been called "the first theme park". The islands were connected by causeways and piers, and each island featured a different international theme. Steamships transported visitors from New York City to the park. The park, which opened in 1881, attracted thousands of people daily, included among its attractions a bathing beach, a natural history museum, a zoo, a German beer garden and castle, musical entertainment, and a Chinese pagoda.

=== Land ownership ===
Until the late 1700s, the area was inhabited to some extent by the Munsee-speaking Siwanoys of Algonquian stock. The first owner of record was John or Johannes Berhuyt or Barhyt, who purchased Jacob Theroulde's farm in 1701. In 1760, the new owner presented the island to his son Andre Barhy, who sold it to his brother-in-law, George Cromwell, six years later. Cromwell's active participation in events leading up to the American Revolution, in opposition to the Patriot cause, brought him disaster, and his property was confiscated. In 1784, it was sold by the Commissioners of Forfeitures.

Later, the island came into the ownership of Samuel Wooley, and accordingly, the island was long called "Wooley's Island". In 1803, Newbury Davenport purchased the island to protect the view from his manor on Davenport Neck, a peninsula of land 50 yards across the open water from the site.

It remained in the Davenport family until 1847, when Lewis Augustus DePau purchased the island for $3,050. Depau was the grandson of the Compte De Grasse, the Admiral of France, commanding the fleets operating with Rochambeau in 1781. De Pau was also Napoleon III's U.S. fiscal agent.

At this time, the island was named "Locust" after the lush groves of locust trees found throughout the property. At the center of the island DePau built a grand mansion surrounded by well landscaped grounds and fish ponds, and containing hot houses, bathing facilities, billiard rooms, and a bowling alley. He used his home to entertain public figures including the singer Jenny Lind and U.S. political leader and statesman Daniel Webster, who met and married his second wife in New Rochelle.

DePau sold the island and mansion to John Schmidt in 1862 before leaving for Prussia. Seventeen years later Schmidt died, and his executors sold the island to entrepreneur John H. Starin for use as a country residence.

=== Starin's Resort ===
Starin's Glen Island
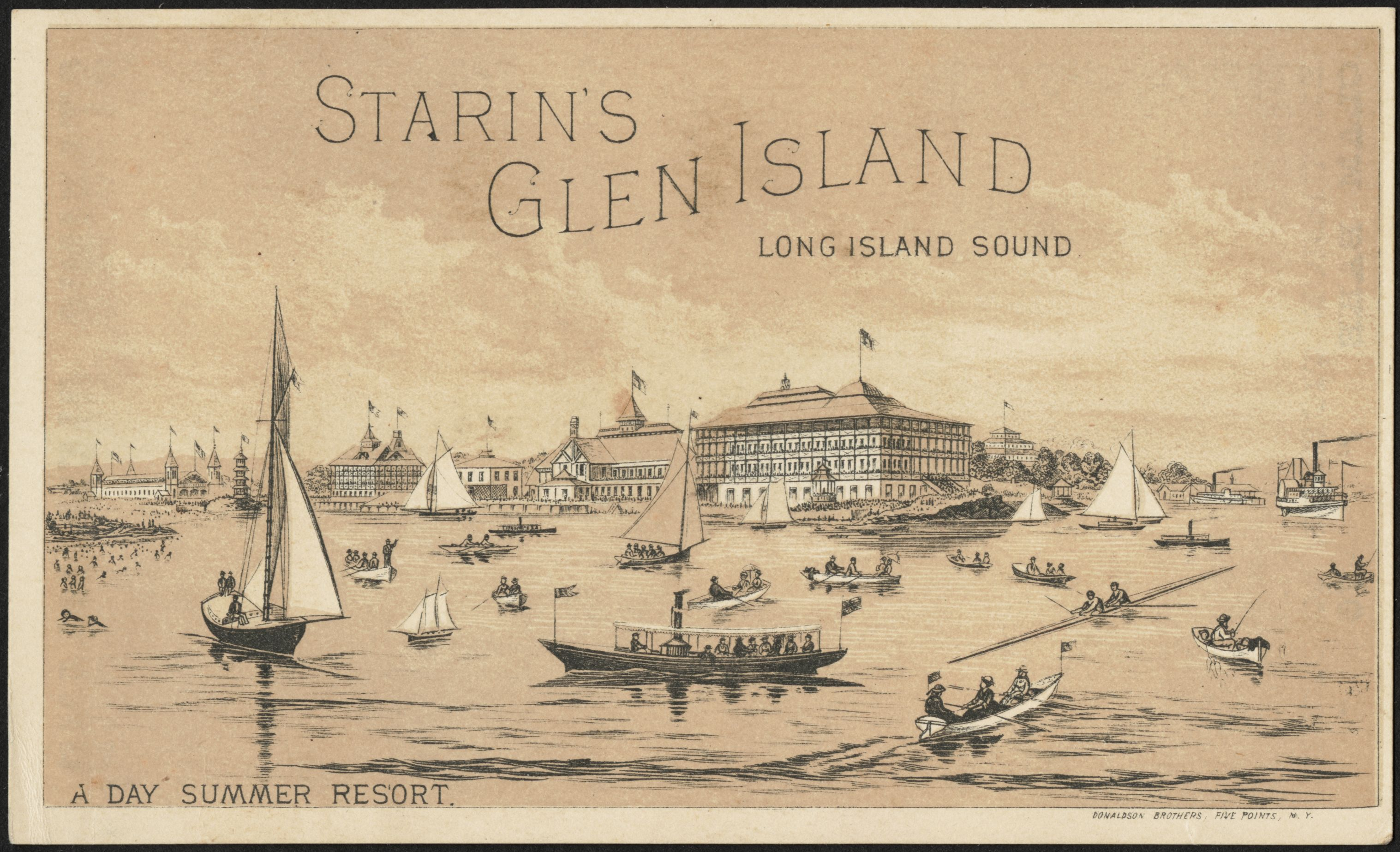
- Promotional postcard (1881).
- Interactive map of Starin's Glen Island
- Status: Defunct
- Opened: 1881
- Closed: 1910

Several years later, Starin purchased four smaller surrounding islands—"Glenwood", "Island Wild", "Beach Lawn", and "Little Germany"—which he used to create an extravagant summer resort and theme park which he named "Glen Island". Starin was the owner of a large transportation company which included nearly every tugboat in New York Harbor and a fleet of passenger steamboats. He used the steamboats to ferry visitors from New York City.

In 1881, the Park opened to the general public, attracting thousands of people daily. For a small excursion fee, steamships carried countless New York families to this summer resort to enjoy its bathing pavilions, fine food and wines at the Grand Cafe, and the scenic beauty of Long Island Sound. The walkways along the harbor were lined with colorful flowers, classic bronze statues, and a natural spring that provided cool, fresh water. Winding pathways led visitors through landscaped grounds where they could escape the summer heat under groves of shade trees. Included among its attractions were musical entertainment and performance bandstands, a camera obscura, a Grand Cafe, an aviary, greenhouses, stone castles, a Dutch mill, and a Chinese pagoda.

A chain ferry transported visitors from a mainland dock on Neptune Island. There was also a nationally recognized Museum of Natural History which housed mummies from 332 B.C., Native American relics of the Stone Age, and other rare antiquities, along with the first fire engine used in New York State, several meteors, and a giant stuffed white whale. There were also bathing beaches, pavilions which could accommodate 800 people, bridle paths, a miniature steam train, and a zoo of exotic animals which included monkeys, lions, elephants, and trained seals.

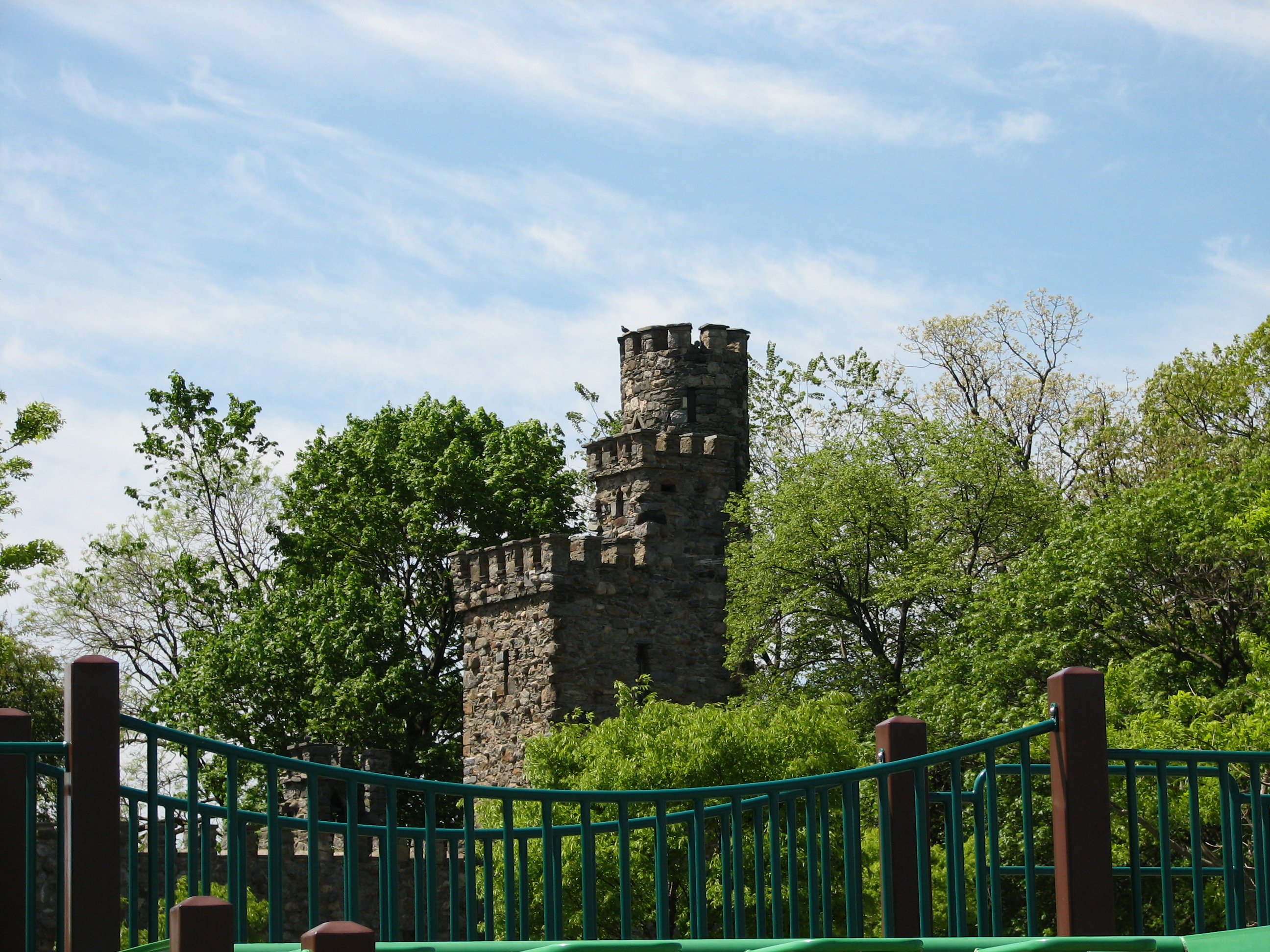
Starnburg Castle in 2006.

The island's main attraction was Starnburg Castle, modeled after medieval Rhine castles. The arched entrance was broad enough to admit a coach into the courtyard leading to the great hall. In the great hall was the "Little Germany" (Klein Deutschland) beer garden, where food and beer were served by waiters in Tyrolean dress.

Starin's Island, internationally acclaimed as "one of the most beautiful spots in America," and "the first summer resort in the United States, if not the world", preceded Disneyland as the first "theme park" by many years.

By 1882 attendance reached half a million, and within six years it broke a million. However, despite the large number of visitors, Starin stressed the well-behaved nature of the crowds and the orderly character of the experience, governed by a "middle-class code of conduct." His desire was to offer an environment of order and civility which contrasted to the rough-and-tumble atmosphere of New York City. Perhaps the most remarkable aspect of the park was that all attractions, rides and amusements were free.

One of the effects of Glen Island's popularity in the beginning of the twentieth century was the building boom in New Rochelle, which had rapidly grown into a summer resort community. This era lasted nearly 40 years.

The beginning of the end of the island's heyday came on June 15, 1904 with the General Slocum disaster, which burned in Hellgate with a loss of more than 1,000 lives. This greatly diminished the steam business at the time, including Starin's. The park closed after the 1904 summer season—although it did briefly reopen in 1910.

Starin died in 1909. On January 29, 1910, The New Rochelle Pioneer reported that the Starin family had sold Glen Island to Ignatz Roth, a woolen importer of 577 Broome Street, New York City, for approximately $600,000. The Pioneer further stated that all of the relics of the late John H. Starin and all other property of his estate were included in the purchase of Glen Island by the Peerless Pictures Corporation, which announced it would "erect the largest and most complete picture studios and laboratories in this country on Island Wild, the most southerly of the group." However, despite such hyperbolic claims, the sale to Peerless was never consummated.

Afterwards, the properties' management passed into other hands and, having become unprofitable, the resort was permanently closed. In 1917, the Glen Islands Corporation declared bankruptcy. The extensive bathing houses were burned, and later Lewis A. DePau's mansion, which had been Starin's summer home, met the same fate.

The park remained virtually untouched until 1924, when the Westchester County Parks Commission purchased it to add to its County Park System. Once under their ownership, extensive landfilling was undertaken to permanently join all five islands together into one larger landmass. A large bascule bridge was also constructed, so that the island would have a permanent link to the mainland and become more accessible to the public.

=== Glen Island Casino ===
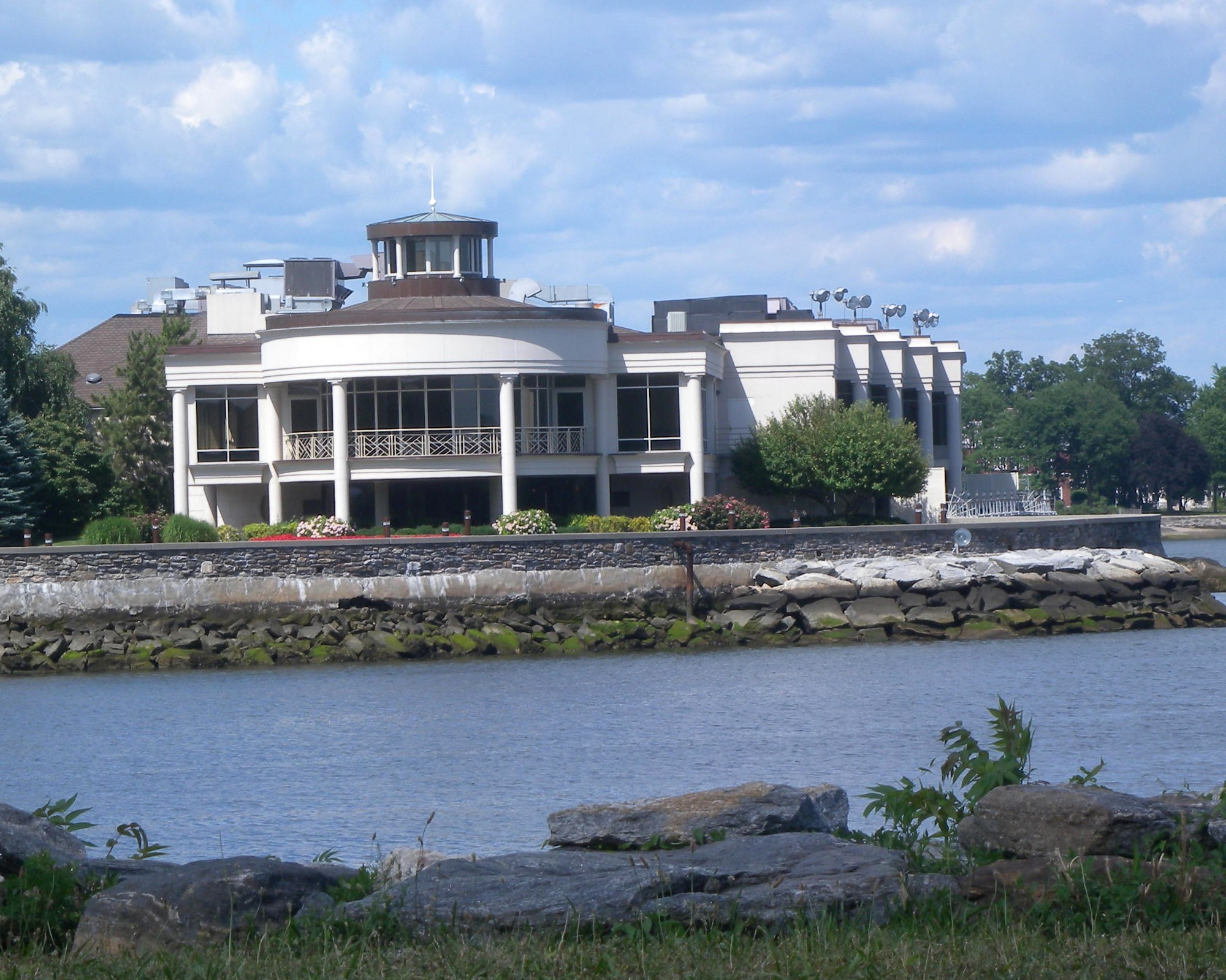
The Glen Island Casino building, seen here in 2011

The Glen Island Casino dining hall rose on the foundation of the Grand Cafe, one of the few structures remaining from Starin's park. The building opened into a series of balconies overlooking the Long Island Sound, which made it an attractive dining and entertaining location.

At the time, the term "casino" was not associated with legalized gambling but instead described "a public social place for entertainment." However, the nightspot was soon living up to the contemporary definition of its name. By 1930, when Prohibition was marking its 10th year in the United States, Glen Island Casino was acquiring a reputation as a speakeasy.

At the same time, the casino had also begun to book up-and-coming musicians for weekend dances. One of the first was Ozzie Nelson, who set the pace packing the 60-foot by 124-foot hall with throngs of young dancers. Accompanied by his wife, Harriet, the Ozzie Nelson Orchestra gained national attention when it played the casino's 1932 season.

The next summer, the most influential band in the United States during the early 1930s, the Casa Loma Orchestra, drew in the crowds and ushered in the Big Band Era for the casino. The performances at the Glen Island Casino were being heard nationwide via radio. Its enormous ballroom was acoustically ideal for crystal-clear radio transmissions. By 1947, several established big-band orchestras had appeared at the casino including Shep Fields' Rippling Rhythm Orchestra.

Many artists made their names at the casino, among them Glenn Miller, the Dorsey Brothers, Benny Goodman, Charlie Barnet, Larry Clinton, Les Brown and Doris Day, Charlie Spivak, Woody Herman, Gene Krupa, Hal Mcintyre, and Claude Thornhill.

After the Big Band Era's end, the Glen Island Casino became a restaurant and catering hall. Following a $10 million restoration in the 21st century, it is an event venue operating as the Glen Island Harbour Club.

=== County management ===
In 1923, Westchester County acquired the site, which is now a public recreational park.

Starnburg Castle has been used in the 2010s for the Iona College and Sarah Lawrence College rowing teams and has sometimes been called Iona Castle.

In 2020 Glen Island Park was temporarily closed and converted into a Coronavirus testing site. It has since been returned for use by Westchester County residents.

== Gallery ==
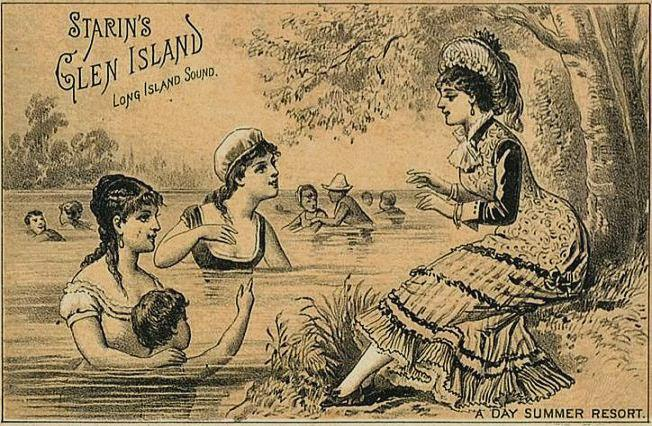
Glen Island postcard.

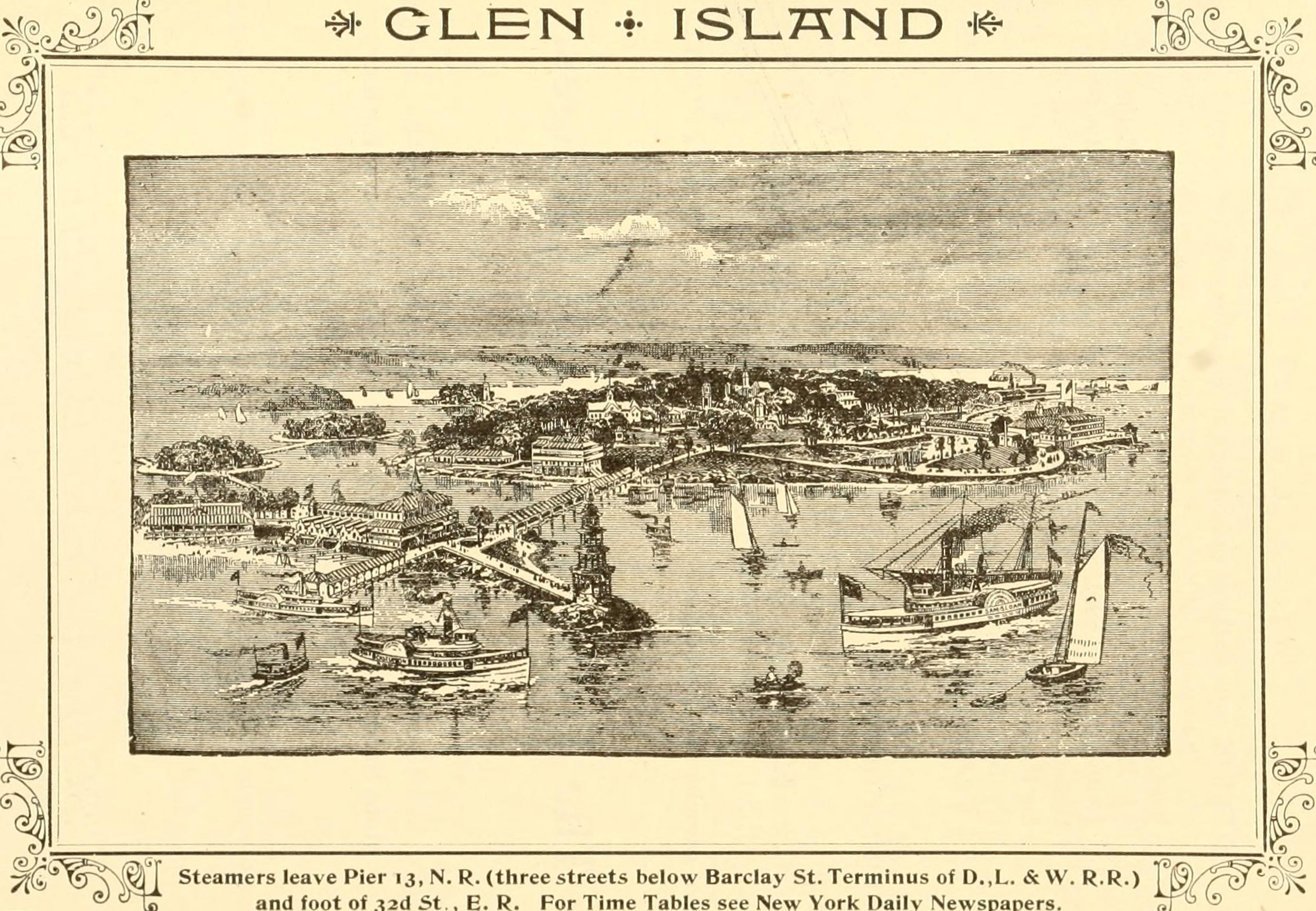
Advertisement for steamships to Glen Island.

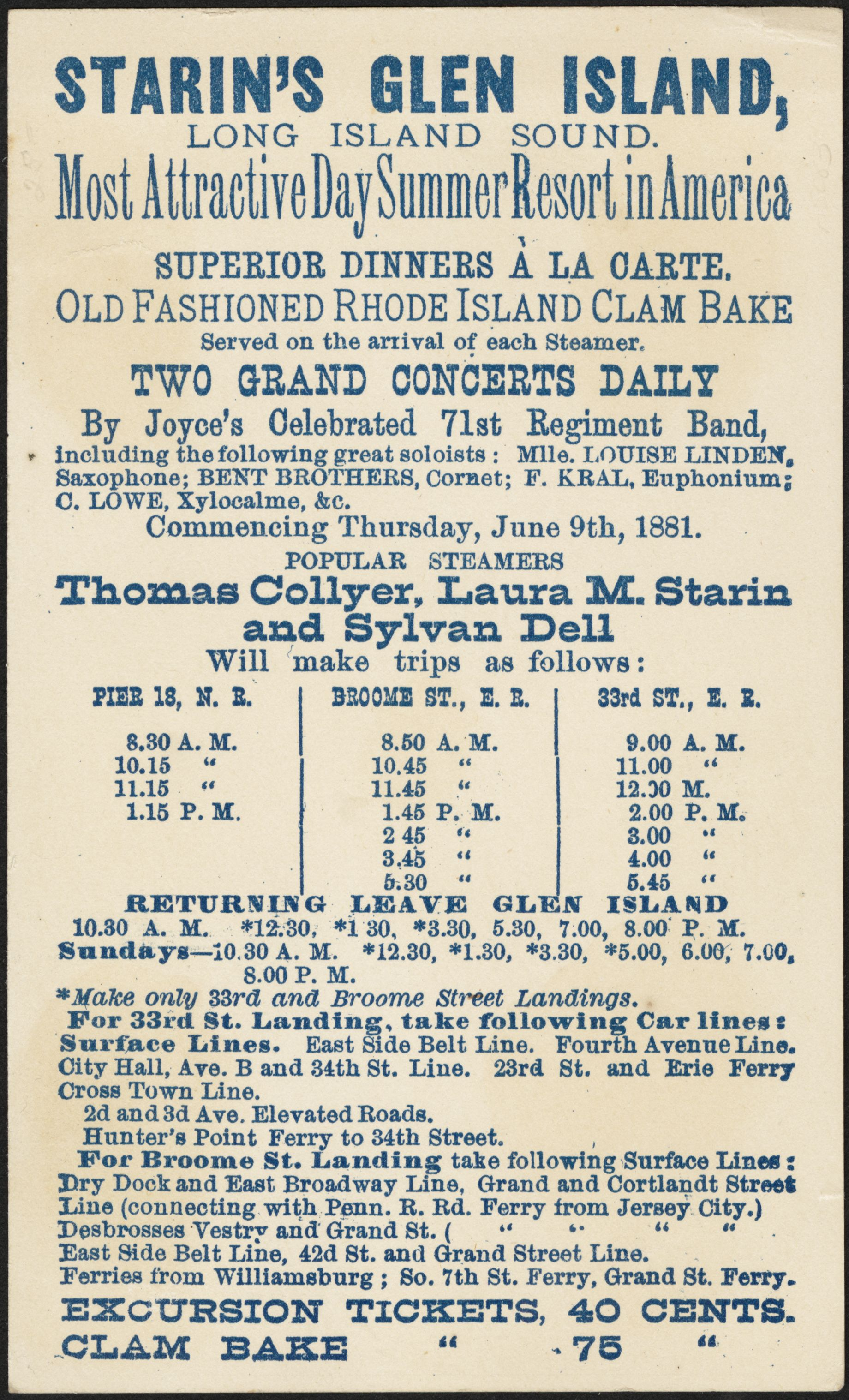
A promotional card detailing attractions and steamship excursions.

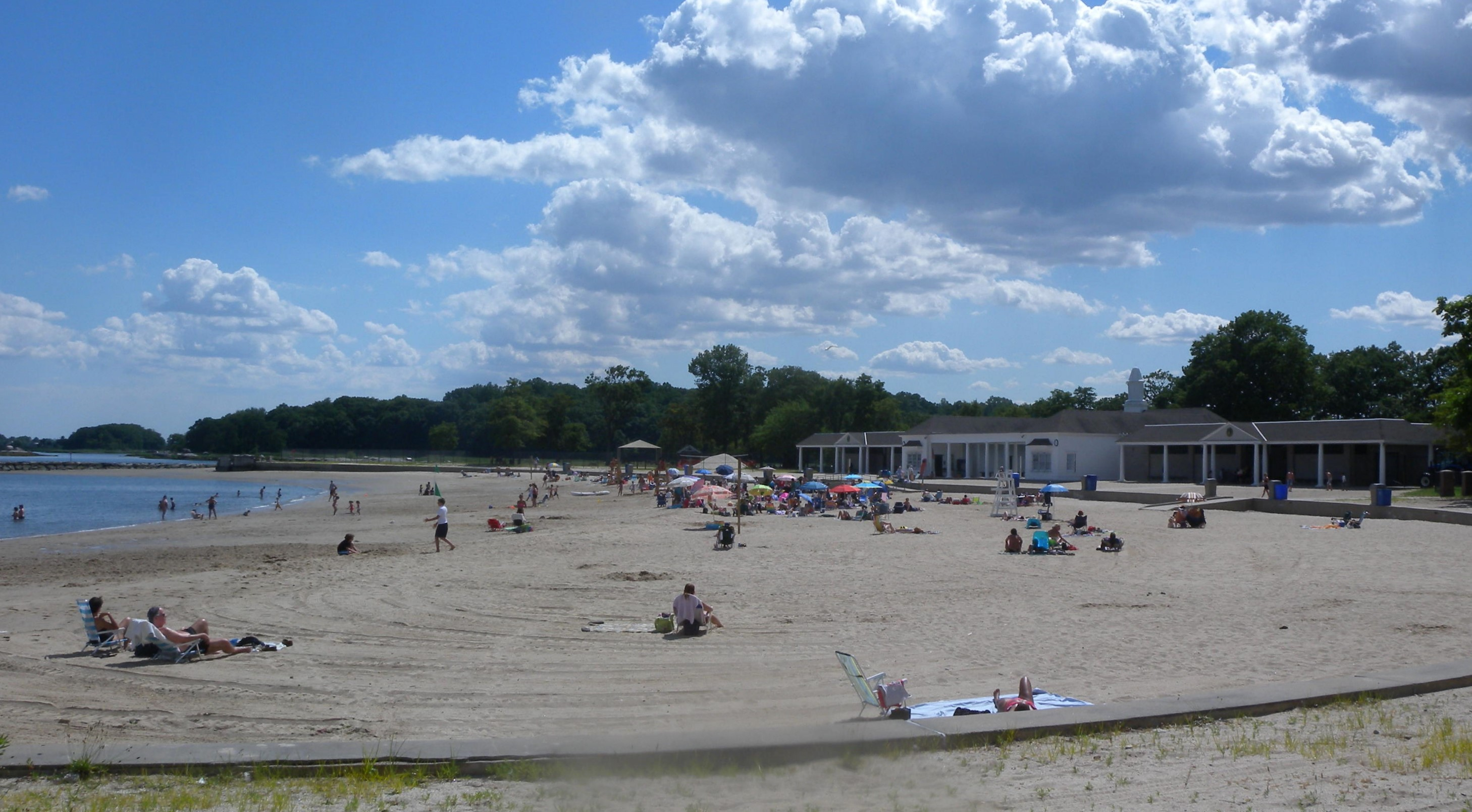

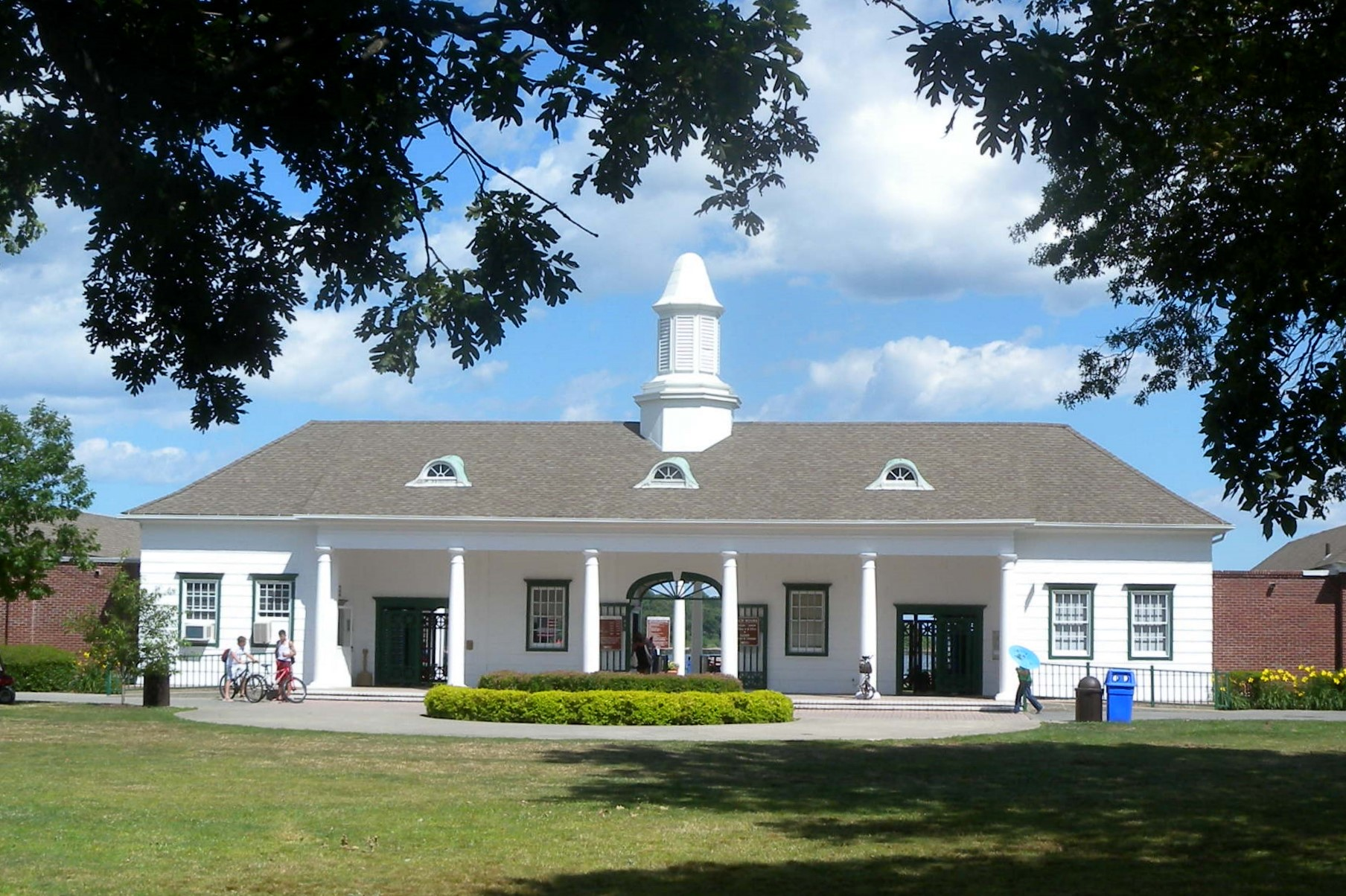

== See also ==
- New York islands
