= Davids Island (New York) =

Island in Westchester County, New York, United States

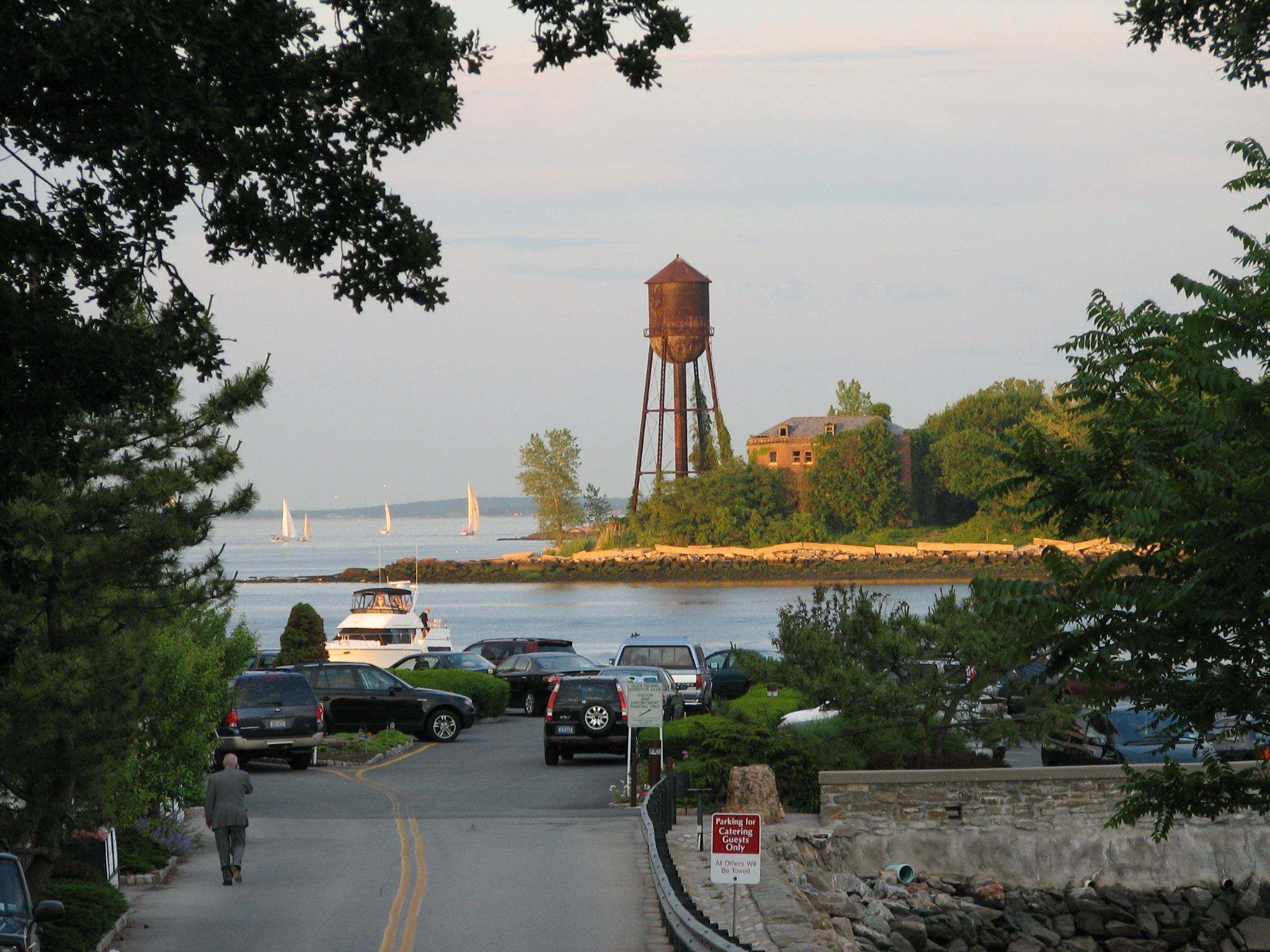
- Pre-2008 view of the northern end of Davids Island

- Location within New York City

Geography
- Location: Long Island Sound
- Coordinates: 40.883417°N 73.770231°W
- Area: 78 acres (32 ha)

Administration
- United States
- State: New York
- County: Westchester County
- City: New Rochelle

Davids Island is a 78-acre (32 ha) island off the coast of New Rochelle, New York, in Long Island Sound. Currently uninhabited, it was previously the site of Fort Slocum. The island is home to the endangered Kemp's ridley sea turtle, and birds such as osprey and least terns. Davids Island also supports valuable wetlands, rare rocky intertidal areas, and sandy beaches. The waters surrounding the island are home to winter flounder, Atlantic herring, and Atlantic silverside.

== Etymology ==
The name is often given as "David Hawk's" or "David Hawk" Island, but neither is correct. The island is named after its next-to-last civilian owner before the Army acquired it: New York City ink manufacturer and Westchester County resident Thaddeus Davids. It was first leased (1861–1867), then owned (1867–1965), by the U.S. government, and was known as "Davids Island Military Reservation" until it was renamed "Fort Slocum" on July 1, 1896. Previously, it had been named after other owners and was called successively Bouteillier's, Rodman's, Myer's, Treadwell's, Hewlett's, Allen's, and Morse's Island.

== Historical uses ==
During the last periods before European explorers and colonists arrived, Native Americans inhabited Davids Island. By the mid 17th century, the area that would become New Rochelle was inhabited by a Native American group known as the Siwanoy. Archeological evidence from Davids Island indicates that Native Americans inhabited the island from 1,000 to 1,500 AD. Native Americans began to withdraw from New York's coastal areas in the 1600s, as European traders and colonists began to enter the region. In 1654, Thomas Pell acquired from the Siwanoys title for the land that now includes Davids Island and southern Westchester County.

From colonial times to the mid-19th century, Davids Island was one of many small islands off the north shore of Long Island Sound used for farming and pasturing animals. Permanent Euro-American occupation of Davids Island began with the arrival of Huguenot settlers to the area in the late 1600s.

By the middle of the 19th century, summertime steamboat excursions to New Rochelle gave city dwellers from New York City and Brooklyn a chance to escape the urban crowds and grime for a few hours. Davids, Neptune, and Glen Islands were all regular stops for excursion steamers.

In November 1856, ink manufacturer Thaddeus Davids purchased the island, after which time the island took his name. Davids had intended to move his factory to the island but never did so. In 1862, he leased the island to Simeon Leland, a prominent hotelier, who then subleased it to the U.S. War Department for hospital purposes. De Camp General Hospital was soon established, and wooden structures were erected to house thousands of wounded prisoners from the battlefields of the Civil War. By late 1862, De Camp was the Army's largest general hospital, housing more than 2,100 patients. Originally, the hospital treated only Union soldiers, but following the Battle of Gettysburg in July 1863, the War Department opened it to care for hundreds of wounded Confederate soldiers. Davids Island soon held more than 2,500 Confederate prisoners. Most had recovered by October and were moved to prisoner of war camps elsewhere.

A ferry connection was established from Neptune Island, under the control of Simeon Leland. At the end of the war, Congress authorized the island's purchase for military purposes, and it was conveyed to the United States in 1867. From this date, the federal government operated its own ferry to and from Neptune Island. In July 1878 Davids Island was made a principal depot of the U.S. Army General Recruiting Service, taking over this assignment from Governors Island. This marked the beginning of the installation's longstanding mission as a recruitment and training center.

It was later converted to a coastal artillery defense post and was named Fort Slocum, after Major General Henry W. Slocum, U.S. Volunteers. Between 1891 and 1904, artillery batteries were erected at three places on the eastern half of the island: Battery Practice near the southeastern shoreline; the state-of-the-art heavy mortar battery, Battery Haskin-Overton, near the southern end of the island; and two adjoining medium-range gun batteries, Fraser and Kinney, on the northeastern shore.

At the start of the 20th century, the island had become the East Coast assembly point for units being assigned to America's new overseas operations. By the onset of World War I, it had become one of the busiest recruiting stations in the country, processing 100,000 soldiers per year. From 1946 to 1949, Fort Slocum housed the headquarters of the First Air Force. In June 1949, it was renamed Slocum Air Force Base; this only lasted for a year before it was turned back into an Army post in June 1950. From 1955 to 1960, Fort Slocum housed Nike Ajax air-defense battery NY-15. The missiles were stored in underground silos on Hart Island with the radar and control base on Davids Island. In July 1960, after only five years of operation, Nike Battery NY-15 was closed.

In April 1951, the U.S. Army Chaplain School was relocated to Fort Slocum, and became the main tenant on the base until 1962. Four Army ferry boats were used to connect the base to the mainland. The two larger boats, FB-901 and FB-902 carried passengers, cars, and tractor trailer trucks from the mainland to the island. The two smaller boats carried passengers only, and no vehicles. The two smaller boats were also used for occasional excursions, including taking troops and their families to the 1964 N.Y. World Fair in Queens.

In the mid-1960s, Secretary of Defense Robert McNamara conducted a highly publicized study to identify Army, Navy and Air Force bases that could be closed or consolidated to try to save money. Fort Slocum was a victim of that study. Fort Slocum was deactivated on November 30, 1965. During the decades that followed, the facilities of the former Army post were neglected and deteriorated severely.

== Redevelopment ==
In 1967, the city of New Rochelle purchased Davids Island, initially using it for the site of a summer camp for New Rochelle youth. During the summers of 1967 and 1968, David's Island was the site for two conferences sponsored by Up With People. In 1968, Consolidated Edison (Con Ed) purchased the island for three million dollars, with a view to building a nuclear power plant there. Con Ed dropped these plans in 1973 and resold the island to New Rochelle in 1976, for $1. In 1977, following ten years of neglect, New Rochelle designated the island, with its remnants of Fort Slocum, as an urban renewal area.

Xanadu Properties Associates proposed to redevelop Davids Island in 1981. Their plans included the construction of a bridge, breakwater for an 800-boat marina, and 2,000 luxury condominium units. However, because of the grand scale of Xanadu's plans, the proposed development was highly controversial among the public. In 1987, a conservation group called Save Davids Island for the Citizens, comprising neighboring property owners and concerned Westchester County residents, formed to oppose Xanadu. Further opposition came from state officials concerned about the potential lack of general public access to shoreline areas. In 1992, the city of New Rochelle opted not to extend Xanadu's status as the designated developer for Davids Island and instead sought new proposals. In response, developer Donald Trump briefly pursued the opportunity to redevelop the island, but the plans were cancelled while still preliminary.

The ruins of Fort Slocum continued to occupy Davids Island into the beginning of the 21st century and were among the factors complicating redevelopment of the island. Beginning in 2004, however, Congress appropriated funds to remove the ruins through a Defense Department program that assists communities in reusing former defense facilities. During the summer of 2008, the city of New Rochelle demolished all remaining structures on the island, including the iconic water tower on the northern end of the island, with plans to turn the island into a park.

== Gallery ==
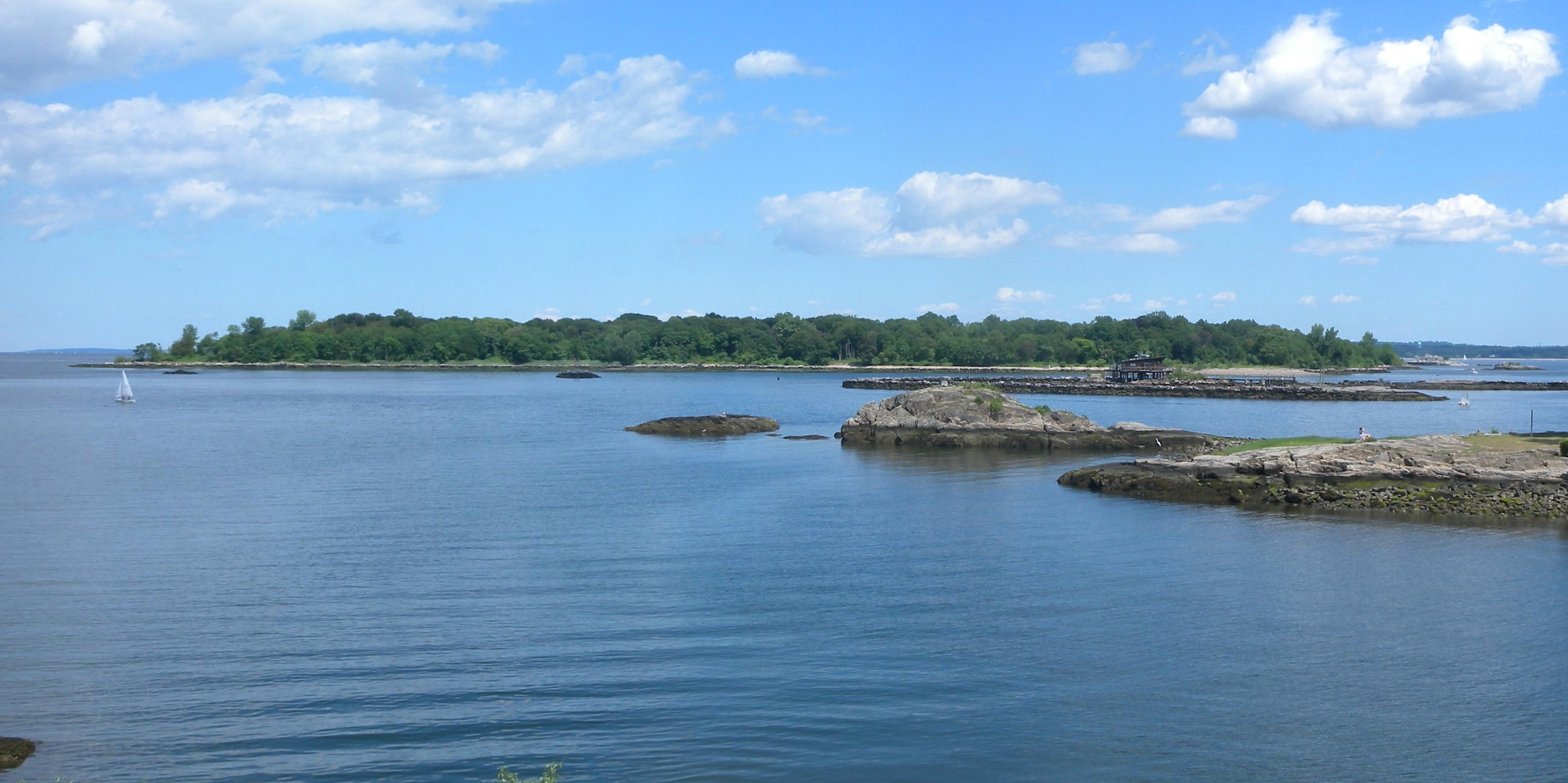
Western view of island

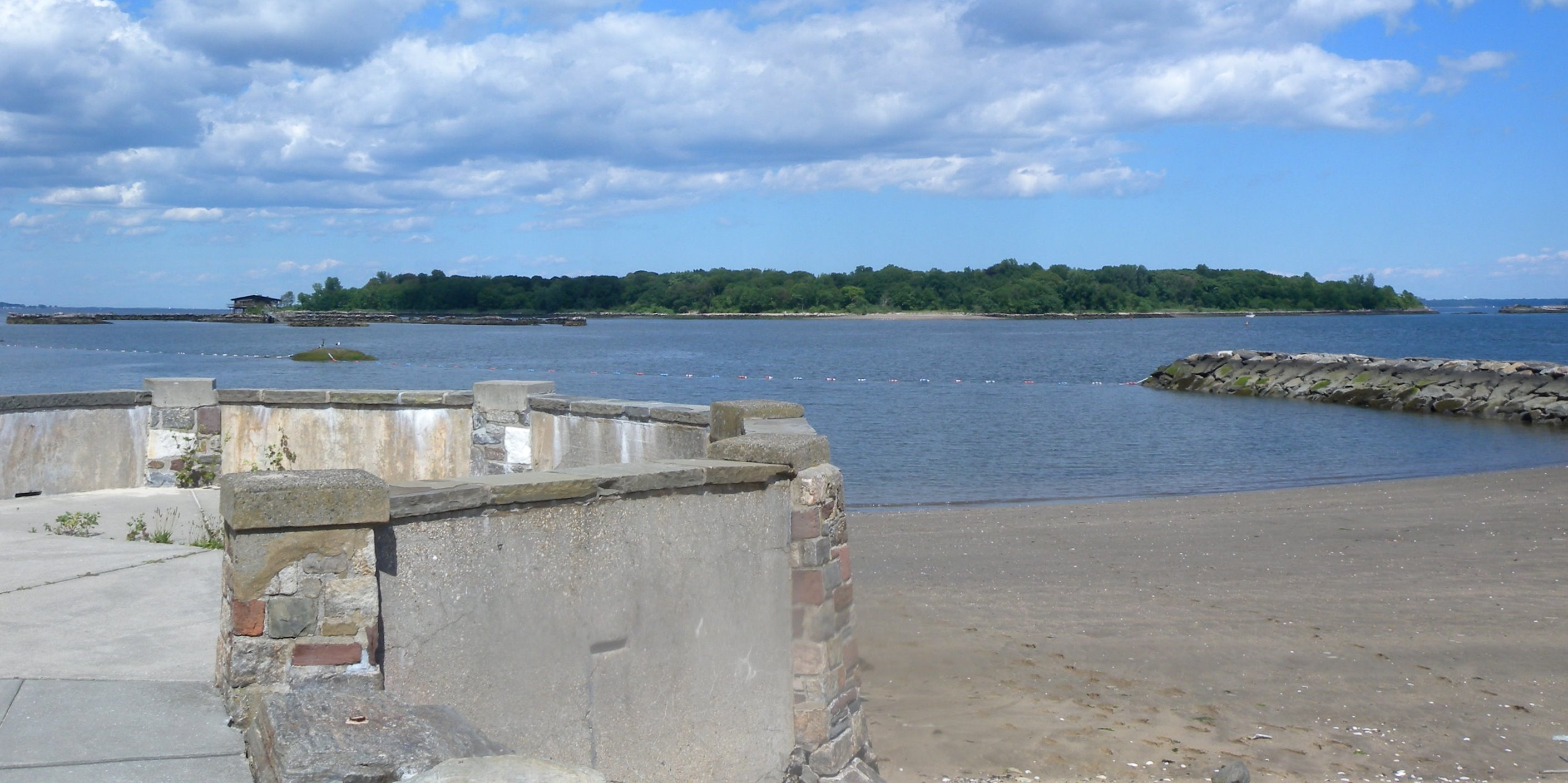
View of island from Glen Island

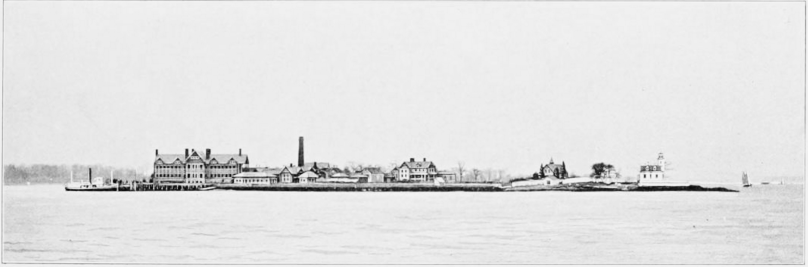
View of Davids Island, 1900

== See also ==
- Hart Island, Bronx
- List of Civil War POW prisons and camps
