= History of New Rochelle, New York =

New Rochelle (French: Nouvelle-Rochelle [la nuvɛl ʁoʃɛl]) is a city in Westchester County, New York, United States, in the southeastern portion of the state. The town was settled by Huguenots (French Protestants) in 1688 who fled France following their failed rebellions. A number of the settlers were wealthy merchants, artisans and craftsmen from the city of La Rochelle, France, thus influencing the choice of the name of "New Rochelle".

In 2007, the city had a population of 73,260, making it the seventh largest in the state of New York.

== 17th century ==
=== Protestants in France ===
In 1685, the absolutist Catholic monarch of France Louis XIV unilaterally revoked the Edict of Nantes. This royal edict had protected the minority Protestant population from religious persecution within certain defined areas of France. Despite the fact that the Protestants were France's most industrious class, Louis XIV was determined to drive them out of France. Faced with the prospect of the resurgence of another war of religion, Protestant countries of Europe opened up their territories to these French Protestants, or Huguenots. Sir John Pell, Lord of Pelham Manor, under warrant from the King William III of England, provided land to Huguenot families, most of whom were from the Province of Aunis and the city of La Rochelle.

=== Settlement ===
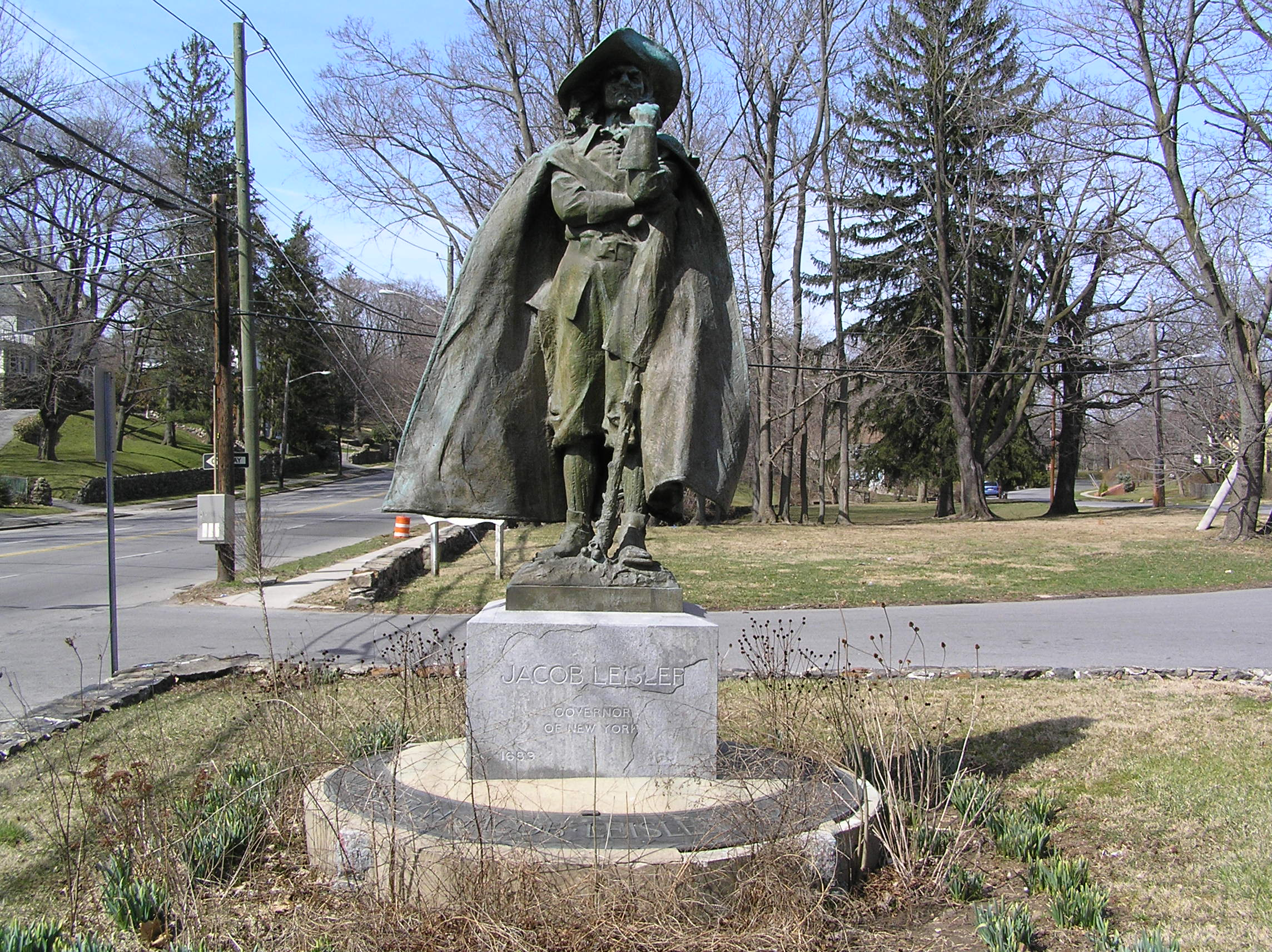
Statue of Jacob Leisler

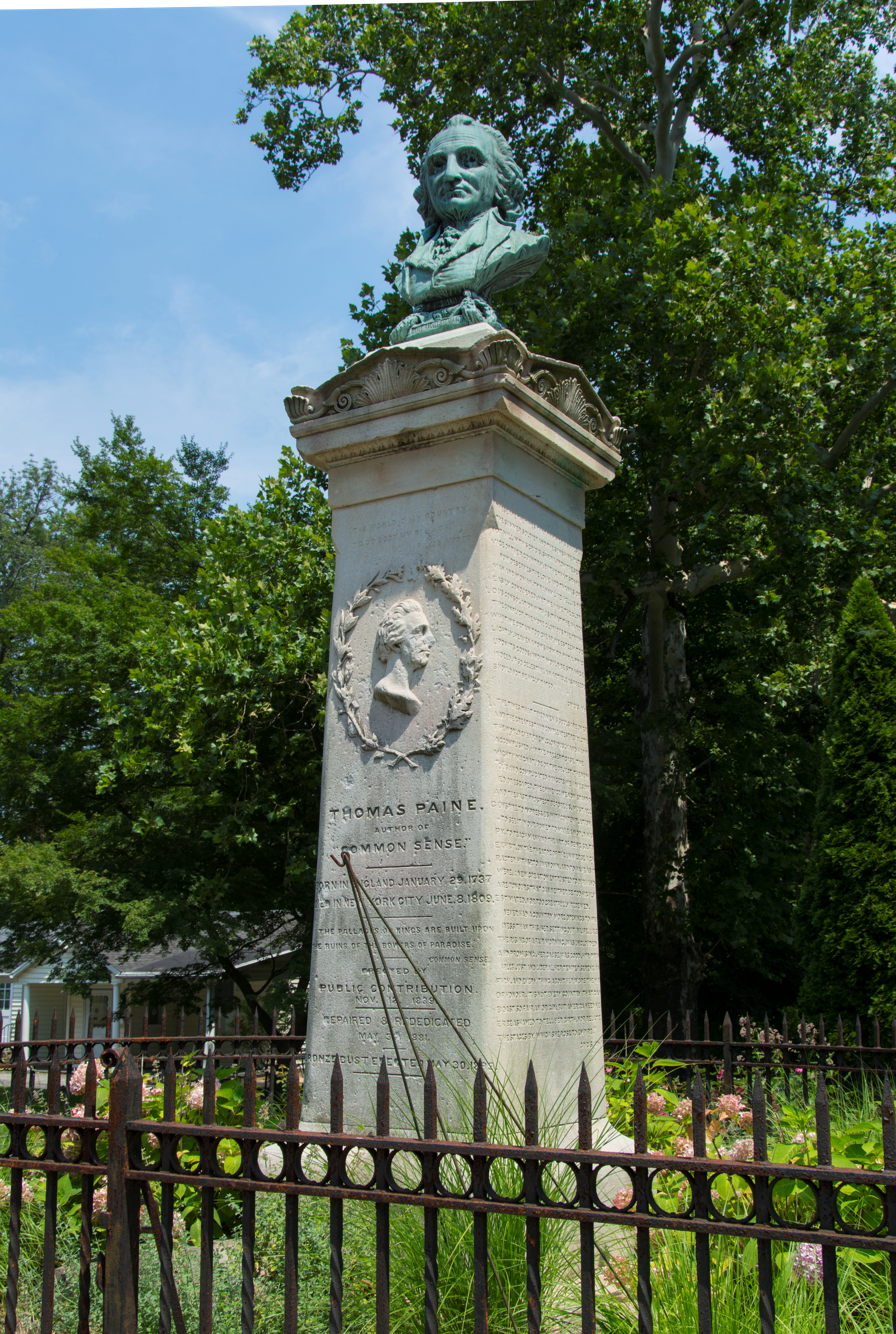
The Thomas Paine Monument

Some 33 families established the community of New Rochelle. A monument containing the names of these settlers stands in Hudson Park, the original landing point of the Huguenots in 1688. It does not, however, contain the names of the slaves whom the Huguenots brought with them, having picked them up on their way to America when they stopped at the Caribbean island of Grenada, a major hub for the Atlantic slave trade.

Thirty-one years earlier, the Siwanoy Indians were pressed to sell their land to Thomas Pell. His land patent was confirmed by his nephew, John Pell, who became lord of Pelham Manor - a feudal domain with its own civil and criminal courts. It was from John Pell and his wife that Jacob Leisler, acting as an agent for a group of Huguenots in New York, purchased the land upon which they would settle for a sum of 1,675 pounds. In 1689 Pell officially deeded 6,100 acres (25 km^{2}) to Leisler for the establishment of a Huguenot community. In addition to the purchase money, Jacob Leisler and his heirs and assigns were to yield and pay unto John Pell and his heirs and assigns (Lords of the Pelham Manor) one 'Fat Calf' yearly as acknowledgement of their feudal obligation to the Manor.

Jacob Leisler is an important figure in the early histories of both New Rochelle and the nation. He arrived in America as a soldier with the Dutch West India Company and later became one of the most prominent merchants in New York. When word reached New York City of the invasion of England by William of Orange, forcing King James to flee to France, militia officers deposed the royal authority by force of arms (but without actual combat) and named Leisler their commander-in-chief. He went on to take control of Albany, and appointed himself lieutenant governor of the province, collected taxes and launched an unsuccessful invasion of New France (Canada). The New York City government did not acknowledge his legitimacy, but he had effective control of the city. It was during this time that he acted on behalf of the Huguenots. When the new king William finally sent a representative and troops to re-establish royal control, Leisler was convicted by him of treason and executed, even though the rationale for Leisler's rebellion had been to take control on behalf of the new king and to prepare the province to defend itself from an expected invasion by France, which had immediately declared war when William took the throne. Leisler was posthumously pardoned by parliament and his property, which had been confiscated as part of the punishment for treason, was restored to his heirs.

Several other prominent Huguenots were integral in the creation of New Rochelle, including Jacques Flandreau, Gabriel Minvielle, Broussard Des Champs, Jean Bouteillier, and Ambroise Sicard, to who the naming of the town is attributed. Jacques Flandreau owned extensive acreage in town and along the Boston Post Road; of their family cemetery, Flandreau Cemetery, a small and overgrown part remains. Gabriel Minvielle arrived in New York in 1673 and prospered both as a merchant and also politically, becoming mayor of New York City in 1684. Broussard Des Champs was in New York as early as 1674, where he was established as a merchant. Between 1678 and 1683 he was involved in lending money on mortgage on lands in and around New York City and on Long Island. Bouteillier was a merchant on the Island of Martinique as early as 1678, and, upon his removal to New York, he became actively interested in helping other refugees upon their arrival to the city.

Each of these men participated in promoting the first settlement of Huguenots at New Rochelle along with the assistance of Jacob Leisler. An initial purchase of the tract including Davenport Neck and the adjacent island, now Davids'Island, with Leisler securing the largest share. This purchase proved too limited to handle the large number of refugees arriving in New York, thus resulting in the larger purchase of land from John Pell in 1687. No conveyance of the New Rochelle purchase, pursuant to the 1687 contract, was delivered until 1689, and John Pell conveyed it to Jacob Leisler alone, ignoring all others interested in the purchase. The explanation may be that there had already developed among the Huguenot refugees considerable hostility to Leisler and opposition to his political activities and ambitions. A number of the prominent settlers of New Rochelle actively opposed Leisler. Minivielle was so hostile that he cast his vote in the Governor's Council in 1691 for Leisler's execution.

=== French character ===
Of all the Huguenot settlements in America founded with the view of being distinct French colonies, New Rochelle most clearly conformed to the plans of its founders. The colony continued to attract French refugees until as late as 1760. The choice of name for the city reflected the importance of the city of La Rochelle and of the new settlement in Huguenot history and distinctly French character of the community. French was spoken, and it was common practice for people in neighboring areas to send their children to New Rochelle to learn the language. Supreme Court Chief Justice John Jay and author Washington Irving were among the most notable individuals to have been educated in the private boarding school at Trinity Church.

=== Early African American community ===
The town's African-American community dates back to the late 17th century, when between 14 and 18 percent of the population was black, mostly enslaved. The first slaves were brought to the area by the early Huguenot settlers. The historic black neighborhood, called Pugsley’s Hollow, was established on farmland deeded by Hannah Pugsley, a member of Westchester's large Quaker Pugsley family, to her African American servant. When Hanna died in 1799, she willed "my Negro Woman Hannah her freedom and That She Shall be No Longer a Slave." Some other enslaved residents of New Rochelle acquired their freedom by escaping from their masters; several of their names are mentioned in the Book of Negroes.

== 18th century ==
The French Huguenots, as Protestant Europeans, quickly assimilated into the English colony. Although most continued to marry within other Huguenot families over the first two generations, the colonists' use of English and their similarity in customs and race to the larger English population quickly promoted the assimilation of the Huguenots into overall society. By 1738 the last recorded entries in French were made on town records.

=== Revolutionary War ===
In 1775 General George Washington stopped in New Rochelle on his way to assume command of the Army of the United Colonies in Massachusetts, recounting: "The road for the greater part, indeed the whole way, but the land strong and well covered with grass and a crop of Indian corn intermixed with Pompions (which were yet ungathered) in the fields... The distance of this day's travel was 31 miles (50 km) in which we passed through Eastchester, New Rochelle, Mamaroneck, but as these places (although they have houses of worship in them) are not regularly laid out, they are scarcely to be distinguished from the immediate farms which are close together and are separated as one inclosure from another is, by fences of stones which are indeed easily made as the country is immensely stony". The British Army briefly occupied sections of New Rochelle and Larchmont in 1776. Following British victory in the Battle of White Plains, New Rochelle became part of the infamous Neutral Ground of Westchester County.

After the Revolutionary War ended in 1784, patriot Thomas Paine was given a farm in New Rochelle for his service to the cause of independence. The farm, totaling about 300 acres (1.2 km^{2}), had been confiscated from its owners by state of New York due to their Tory activities. Now located on a small street in New Rochelle, the Thomas Paine Cottage is a small museum where multiple Revolutionary War re-enactments occur. Six years after the Revolutionary War had ended, the first national census of 1790 shows New Rochelle with 692 residents, 136 of whom were African American.

== 19th century ==
Steamboat travel along Long Island Sound to New Rochelle propelled the farming community into a resort destination. With the wide open vistas, clean air and aquatic activities just a boat ride away made New Rochelle a popular destination for New Yorkers.

The first passenger train of the New Haven Railroad steamed into town on New Year's Day, 1849, and within a few decades rail service was suitable for daily travel. As a result, a number of the former vacationers began planting roots in the community - the wealthy building summer estates, the middle-class families purchasing homes in developing residential parks. The train also brought new immigrants to town – the New Rochelle station was the first stop on the New Haven line and a quick trip from the ferry dock off Ellis Island. By 1865, 30% of the town's population was foreign-born. Of New Rochelle's 3,968 residents, 800 were Irish and 200 were German.

The depot became the catalyst for shops, newspaper offices, banks, tearooms, and other enterprises that evolved into a permanent and thriving downtown area that was within the Village of New Rochelle (a 950 section that had been established in 1857). With its own president and board of trustees, the Village eventually included most of the southern part of the community.

=== Early economy ===
Historical population
Census	Pop.	Note	%±
1790	692		—
1820	1,135		—
1830	1,274		12.2%
1840	1,816		42.5%
1850	2,458		35.4%
1860	3,519		43.2%
1870	3,915		11.3%
1880	5,276		34.8%
1890	9,057		71.7%
1900	14,720		62.5%
1910	28,867		96.1%
1920	36,213		25.4%
1930	54,000		49.1%
1940	58,408		8.2%
1950	59,725		2.3%
1960	76,812		28.6%
1970	75,385		−1.9%
1980	70,794		−6.1%
1990	67,265		−5.0%
2000	72,182		7.3%
2010	77,062		6.8%
2018 (est.)	78,742		2.2%
U.S. Decennial Census

Through the 18th century, New Rochelle had remained a modest village that retained an abundance of agricultural land. During the 19th century, however, with the rapid growth of New York City by immigration principally from Ireland and Germany, more American families left New York City and moved into the area. Although the original Huguenot population was rapidly shrinking in relative size, through ownership of land, businesses, banks, and small manufactures, they retained a predominant hold on the political and social life of the town. A toll-house was constructed in 1802 across the Westchester County Turnpike (now known as Main Street). Four cents was charged for each horse and rider and ten cents was charged for each horse-drawn cart. The toll-house remained in operation until the discontinuation of all tolls in 1867.

The Mott family built Premium Mill in 1801. Said to be the country's largest flour mill, it was four stories high with a twelve-stone run. Most of the flour was exported to Europe. The industry and the mill itself declined with the embargoes and port blockades during the War of 1812 and the opening of the Erie Canal.

The 1820 census showed 150 African Americans residing in New Rochelle, six of whom were slaves. Lucretia Mott, whose family owned the mill, formed an anti-slavery society in 1833 and later championed the women's suffrage movement. The Mott family home in New Rochelle may have been used on the Underground Railroad.

In 1849 the ice industry established itself on nearby Crystal Lake. The entire lake and a number of surrounding commercial properties and mills were purchased to further the development of this ice business, and large ice houses were erected south of the Boston Road in the present City Yard. These ice businesses soon became one of the most important in the New York region, supplying the entire New York City and Brooklyn markets. Recognized for the purity of its waters, the lake became known as "Crystal Lake", with its ice marketed as "Crystal Lake Ice."

Washington Irving's publisher, G.P. Putnam, built his manufacturing plant on Webster Avenue in 1890. Irving's best-selling book Diedrich Knickerbocker's History of New York was clearly an inspiration for the massive Dutch-style Knickerbocker Building which housed the company. For 40 years the works of Irving, Herman Melville, Charles Dickens and other celebrated authors were printed and bound at the New Rochelle factory.

In 1892, Rose Hill Gardens, one of the largest botanical gardens in the country during the 1800s, cultivated the first orchid in the United States. Rose Hill consisted of about 68 enormous hothouses, filled with winter-blooming lilies of the valley, roses, and other flowers never before seen in the Americas. The gardens furnished elite florists in Manhattan and premier estate gardens.

=== Civil War ===
As in multiple other cities, towns, hamlets and farms, New Rochelleans answered President Lincoln's call to arms in 1861. Despite a population in New Rochelle of little more than 3,000, the first group of volunteers was formed into the New Rochelle Cadets, led by Lt. Henry Clark, that later became part of Company G, 17th Regiment, New York National Guard. This unit served as garrison defense at Fort McHenry in Baltimore, and all returned safely to New Rochelle in 1863 for a grand reception at Pelor's Tavern.

The city played an even more important strategic role in supporting the Union cause. It was believed that the old Burtis Mill, formerly located at the juncture of Mill Road and North Avenue, manufactured gun carriages for the Union army. Davids Island was also important to the war effort. The DeCamp General Hospital served thousands of wounded Union soldiers. New Rochelle residents knitted clothes and the city's children provided sweets to those on the island. In July 1863, 2500 Confederate soldiers were incarcerated at Davids Island. The prisoners were allowed to fish and clam until several prisoners escaped, according to contemporary reports.

The assassination of President Lincoln in April 1865 disheartened multiple New Rochelleans, despite the fact that a majority had not voted for him in 1860. Reverend John Fowler, Jr. delivered an address at the Old Episcopal Church on April 20, 1865 at the request of New Rochelle residents, eulogizing the late President. John Dyott, the leading male actor in the production of "Our American Cousin" at Ford's Theatre on the night of the assassination, was a New Rochelle resident.

The graying of the veterans in 1896 prompted the citizens of New Rochelle to raise $2500 to erect and dedicate a Civil War memorial, situated at the junction of Huguenot and West Main Streets.

=== Country estates ===
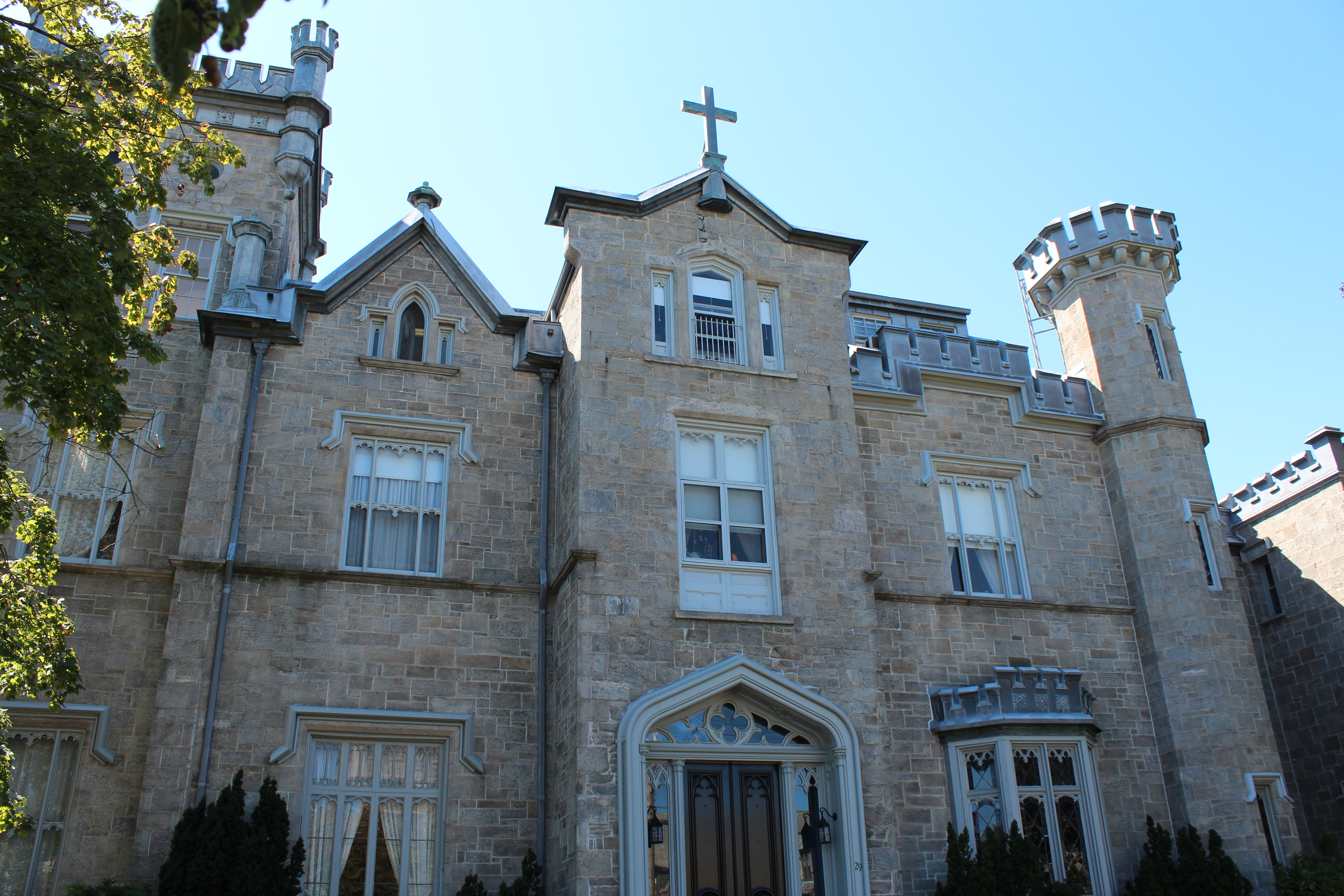
Leland Castle

For the upper echelon of Manhattan, New Rochelle was the perfect location for a summer home in the mid-1800s. Large tracts of farmland on prime waterfront property could be bought up easily and inexpensively. Davenport Neck was a desirable spot for multiple large summer homes and estates. The Davenport family, for whom the important promontory is named, commissioned one of the country's leading architects, Alexander Jackson Davis, to design Overlook above Echo Bay, and the larger Gothic villa Sans Souci in the middle of the Neck. Other Davis designs were built inland including Winyah Park, the country estate of Colonel Richard Lathers, and the investment homes "Tudor Villa", "Pointed Villa", "Gothic Cottage" and "The Rambler" of 'Lather's Woods'. In 1892 the artist Frederic Remington purchased one of Lather's Woods homes situated on a 3-acre (12,000 m^{2}) estate.

Industrialist Adrian G Iselin purchased land on Davenport Neck in 1858. The Iselin family built homes across the Neck and nearby Premium Point, several of which were designed by leading architect Stanford White and landscape architect Frederick Law Olmsted. The family began the New Rochelle Water Company as well as the first savings bank in the city. Charles Oliver Iselin, and the six other children of Adrian Iselin, engaged in multiple philanthropic causes in New Rochelle, donating substantial financial gifts to The College of New Rochelle, New Rochelle hospital and also the World War Memorial Committee.

Wealthy hotelier Simeon Leland bought 40 acres of farmland on which his 60-room summer home, "Castle View", was completed in 1855. Builder-architect Thomas Beers took four years to complete the home, which included a moat and fine woodwork crafted by masters brought over from Germany. Notable guests of "Castle View" included the Prince of Wales and Charles Dickens.

John Stephenson, inventor of the horse-drawn streetcar, was a frequent vacationer to New Rochelle. He purchased a large tract of shoreline property in 1862 and built 'Clifford', a towering mansion overlooking Echo Bay.

=== Beginning tourism ===
New Rochelle's location on Long Island Sound propelled the farming community into becoming a resort destination. Sophisticated entrepreneurs and the advancement of steamboat travel ensured its success, as developers and visitors were lured by the country landscape and unlimited aquatic activities offered by waterfront hotels and resorts, just a boat ride from the crowded streets of Manhattan.

The Neptune House summer resort hotel was constructed on Neptune Island in 1837. Its wooded location overlooking Long Island Sound made it a popular destination for New Yorkers looking to get away. Early steamboats shuttled individuals between New York City and the Neptune House dock

John H. Starin, a former United States Congressman and descendant of the Huguenots, purchased five islands off of Davenport Neck in 1879 which he transformed into one of the earliest and most extravagant amusement areas in the country - Starin's Glen Island Resort. Starin owned the largest fleet of steamboats in Manhattan and utilized his fleet to carry thousands of New Yorkers to the park each year. Features of the park included beaches and bathing pavilions, gardens, German beer garden, Grand Cafe, Chinese pagoda, bridle paths, a miniature steam train, natural history museum, aviary, and a zoo of exotic animals which included lions, elephants and trained seals. Perhaps the most remarkable aspect of the park was that all attractions, rides and amusements were free.

Glen Island became internationally acclaimed as "one of the most beautiful spots in America" and considered "the first summer resort in the United States, if not the world", preceded Disneyland as the first "theme park" by multiple years. By 1882 attendance reached half a million and within six years it broke a million. One of the effects of Glen Islands popularity in the beginning of the twentieth century was the building boom in New Rochelle, which had rapidly grown into a summer resort community.

=== Government and politics ===
In 1857 the Village of New Rochelle was established within the borders of the Town of New Rochelle and in 1861 a group of volunteers created the first fire service named ‘The Enterprise Hook/Ladder/Bucket Company #1’. A bill creating the New Rochelle City Charter was signed by Governor Theodore Roosevelt in 1889. It was through this bill that the Village and Town of New Rochelle were joined into one municipality. Davids’ Island became the site of Fort Slocum in 1896, named for General Henry Warner Slocum, a Huguenot descendant and a Civil War officer. Fort Slocum became one of the largest recruiting stations in the country, with greatest use during World War I and World War II. In 1899 Michael J. Dillon narrowly defeated Hugh A. Harmer to become New Rochelle's first mayor. The recently established city charter designated four wards, a board of aldermen (two from each ward), and 10 elected from the city at large.

== 20th century ==
Poet and resident James J. Montague captured the image of New Rochelle in his 1926 poem Queen City of the Sound. The last four lines of the poem are:

:(...)

When Nature, seeking upon men

To cast a magic spell,

She looked the world around - and then

She fashioned New Rochelle.

— James J. Montague

=== Suburban living ===
Soon after the Town of New Rochelle and Village of New Rochelle became incorporated as the City of New Rochelle in 1899, the community experienced its greatest growth, including the development of the Wykagyl business district and residential parks — the result of the short-lived New York-Westchester-Boston Railway. Attractive neighborhoods, nine miles of waterfront, efficient rail services, a strong school system and ease of automobile travel when the Hutchinson River Parkway was built, secured New Rochelle's place as one of America's premier suburban communities.

Laid out in 1885, Rochelle Park is particularly distinguished as one of the first planned residential communities in the country. A pioneering American landscape architect, Nathan Barrett, incorporated winding boulevards, generous setbacks and public open space into his plan. Due to the success of Rochelle Park, other residential parks soon followed in New Rochelle, including Residence Park, Beechmont, Sutton Manor, and Rochelle Heights.

By 1900 New Rochelle had a population of 14,720. As the effects of continuing immigration continued throughout the northeastern United States and New York in particular, the early French Huguenot character of the town and its ruling class dissolved. In 1930 New Rochelle recorded a population of 54,000, up from 36,213 only ten years earlier. During the 1930s New Rochelle was the wealthiest city per capita in New York state and the third wealthiest in the country.

Two of the nation's first suburban branch department stores, Arnold Constable and Bloomingdales, opened in New Rochelle in the 1940s. The Glen Island Casino was one of the most well-known performance venues for big bands during the 1930s and 1940s.

In just four decades the community's population quadrupled, reaching 54,000 in 1930. New Rochelle witnessed another surge in its population post World War II, when great tracts of new housing were constructed on the last of the community's farmlands and apartment buildings rose along the Shore Road. The construction of the New England Thruway (I-95) in the mid 1950s, which dislocated entire neighborhoods and separated the business district, led to subsequent urban renewal projects, the construction of The Mall, and the start of a lengthy downward spiral for the city's once thriving downtown. Although the community was a forerunner in planning, being one of the first in the country to adopt a zoning code (1929), its long-standing insistence of remaining primarily residential led to decades of budgetary challenges that compounded the decline of the city central.

=== Cultural developments ===
In the early part of the 20th century, the County's famous Glen Island Casino on Long Island Sound had risen on the foundation of the Grand Cafe, one of the few structures remaining from the "world's pleasure grounds", "Starin's Glen Island Resort". The building opened into a series of balconies overlooking the Long Island Sound which made it an attractive dining and entertaining location. At the time, the term "casino" was not associated with legalized gambling but instead described "a public social place for entertainment." However, the nightspot was soon living up to the contemporary definition of its name. By 1930, when Prohibition was marking its tenth year in the United States, Glen Island Casino was acquiring the reputation as being a speakeasy, yet at the same time the Casino had also begun to book up-and coming musicians for weekend dances. One of the first was Oswald George Nelson, better known as "Ozzie", who set the pace packing the 60foot by 124-foot hall with throngs of swooning and swaying young people. Accompanied by girl singer Harriet Hilliard, the Ozzie Nelson Orchestra gained national attention when it played the Casino's 1932 season.

The next summer the most influential white band in the United States during the early 1930s, the Casa Loma Orchestra, drew in the crowds and ushered in the Big Band era for the Casino. The performances at the Glen Island Casino were being heard nationwide. Situated on the Sound, the Casino's enormous ballroom was acoustically ideal for the crystal-clear radio transmissions. Multiple artists made their name and fame at the Casino, among them such notables as Glenn Miller, the Dorsey Brothers, Benny Goodman, Charlie Barnet, Larry Clinton, Les Brown and Doris Day, Charlie Spivak, Woody Herman, Gene Krupa, Hal Mcintyre and Claude Thornhill.

Forty-five Minutes from Broadway, a musical comedy about New Rochelle, opened January 1, 1906. In 1909, Edwin Thanhouser established Thanhouser Film Corporation. Thanhouser's Million Dollar Mystery was one of the first serial motion pictures. The artist Norman Rockwell moved to New Rochelle in 1915, sharing a studio with the cartoonist Clyde Forsythe, who worked for The Saturday Evening Post. He often drew his illustration subjects from members of the community. In 1941 New Rochelle based Terrytoons Studio introduced the famous Mighty Mouse cartoon character. In 1976 New Rochelle resident E.L. Doctorow wrote the novel Ragtime, which would later become a major Broadway musical.

Throughout its long history New Rochelle has attracted an extraordinary number of prominent individuals, including preeminent authors, artists, sports stars, corporate leaders, and national trendsetters. Frederic Remington, Joseph Leyendecker and Norman Rockwell were joined by dozens of other great American artists, illustrators, cartoonists and animators who made their homes and studios in New Rochelle. Silent movies from the renowned Thanhouser Company, Mighty Mouse and other characters from Terrytoons, the Howdy Doody show, and the stories for the televised Dick Van Dyke Show all originated in New Rochelle. Between Yankee games, Lou Gehrig played ball with kids in his New Rochelle neighborhood of Residence Park. Autobiographies of such notables as dancing sensation Irene Castle, director Elia Kazan, and philosopher Joseph Campbell, relate significant memories in New Rochelle.

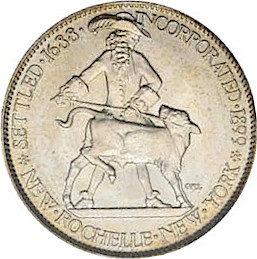
Bicentennial half-dollar

=== Desegregation ===
New Rochelle was the scene of the first court-ordered school desegregation case in "the north", when the U.S. Supreme Court in 1962 denied certiorari and so let stand a decision of the Second Circuit Court of Appeals in Taylor v. Board of Education of City School District of New Rochelle that the Lincoln School boundaries had been intentionally drawn to create segregated elementary school districts. Lincoln School was closed and demolished in 1965, with students of that district allowed to attend certain other city elementary schools. The school system successfully restructured following the tumultuous desegregation case in 1961, and again 20 years later, in response to declining enrollment. Throughout, the standards for educational excellence were achieved. The school district is known for its diversity, and the high school honors civil rights leader Whitney Young in the name of its auditorium and civil rights martyr Michael Schwerner in the name of its library. In May 1968, New Rochelle High School was damaged by an arson fire. Displaced students were accommodated at local junior high schools under a time-sharing arrangement while the high school was being rebuilt.

=== Society and government ===
Mayors of the City of New Rochelle
Mayor	Party	Term
Noam Bramson	Democratic	2006–present
Timothy C. Idoni	Democratic	1992-2005
Leonard C. Paduano	Republican	1980-1991
Vincent R. Rippa	Democratic	1976-1979
Frank J. Garito	Republican	1971-1975
Stanley W. Church	Democratic	1970
Alvin R. Ruskin	Republican	1964-1970
Stanely W. Church	Democratic	1960-1963
George Vergara	Independent	1956-1959
Stanley W. Church	Democratic	1940-1955
Harry Scott	Republican	1935-1940
Charles F. Simmons	Republican	1935
Paul M. Crandell	Republican	1934-1935
Walter G. C. Otto	Democratic	1930-1934
Benjamin B. Badeau	Republican	1926-1929
Harry Scott	Republican	1920-1925
Frederick H. Waldorf	Democratic	1918-1919
Edward Stetson Griffing	Republican	1914-1917
Frederick H. Waldorf	Democratic	1912-1913
Harry E. Colwell	Republican	1910-1911
George G. Raymond	Democratic	1908-1909
Henry S. Clarke	-	1902-1907
Michael Dillon	Democratic	1899-1901
Source: Names and Dates Confirmed by Mayoral Portraits in New Rochelle City Hall

New Rochelle resident Anna Jones became the first African American woman to be admitted to the New York State Bar in 1923. In 1928, women's rights advocate Carrie Chapman Catt settled in New Rochelle. Catt, President of the National American Woman Suffrage Association, was influential in the fight for the 19th Amendment (Susan B. Anthony Amendment).

The city manager form of government was adopted in 1929. Under this arrangement, the city council is the legislative body that establishes city laws, ordinances and resolutions. The council appoints the city manager, who oversees and implements the directives of the council. On June 18, 1938 the City celebrated its 250th anniversary with a massive parade of more than 6,000 marchers. Notable spectators included Governor Herbert H. Lehman, U.S. Postmaster General James A. Farley and a number of visiting dignitaries from La Rochelle, France. The U.S. Government authorized a limited edition of New Rochelle half dollar commemorative coins to mark the anniversary.

In 1987 New Rochelle was awarded the U.S. Conference of Mayors City Livability Award.

== Modern history ==
At the turn of the 21st century, New Rochelle had begun a massive revitalization of its downtown area. Part of downtown near the Metro North train station was rebuilt with a $190 million entertainment complex, nicknamed New Roc City, which features a 19-screen movie theater, Westchester's first IMAX theater, an indoor ice-hockey arena, mini-golf, go-karts, an arcade, a health club, restaurants, a hotel, loft-apartments and a mega supermarket. The complex was built on the former Macy's and Mall which had opened in 1968.

Additional revitalization has come by way of two new luxury residences. The construction of Avalon On The Sound East, a luxury apartment complex was unveiled by Avalon Bay Communities in 2007. Trump Plaza, a 40-story luxury residence is the second tallest building in Westchester County. Properties along 'main street' which had been empty for years, such as the former Bloomingdales department store and Lillian Vernon headquarters, have been transformed into condominiums and rental apartments.

== Railroad history ==
After the end of the Civil War, proposals for new railroads reached new levels. As New York City continued to expand, multiple proposals were made to link The Bronx with Westchester County, hoping to capitalize on increasing real estate values. Banking that the city would continue to grow northward, the New York, Westchester and Boston Railway Company developed new lines of service to serve the large populations moving to the suburbs. Two main lines were built as part of the NYW&B, the Port Chester line and the White Plains line. The Port Chester Line ran along the same route as the New York Railroads New Haven line which remains in service today. The White Plains Line ran north through much of New Rochelle's rural, undeveloped upper end.

Even by 1912, much of Upper Rochelle remained sparsely populated. The Wykagyl and Quaker Ridge stations fronted dirt roads and were not served by public transportation. Ironically, most of the real-estate development that did occur at the time was attracting wealthier residents who owned their own automobiles, frequently chauffeur-driven, and used them instead of public-transportation for local trips. While the populations of some communities served by the NYWB did grow between 1912 and 1937, the growth was not large enough or fast enough to provide sufficient business for the railroad, and service was discontinued on December 31, 1937. The only signs of the railway that are left can be found in a few remaining station houses, most notably the Quaker Ridge station, currently a private residence, and the former Wykagyl station, now part of a shopping center.

== Main Street ==
The thriving farming community of New Rochelle in the 1700s and 1800s relied on "Main Street"’s feed shops, blacksmiths, coach makers, dry good stores, and others carriage trades. When New Rochelle became a major resort destination, as a result of steamboat travel along its Long Island Sound shoreline, more hotels rose along Main Street and more businesses flourished. Once rail travel improved, New Rochelle’s downtown depot was instrumental in securing New Rochelle’s place on the map.

Nineteenth century shopping in New Rochelle was concentrated around "Main Street", an area of close spaced stores, accessible to one another on foot. By the 1920s, New Rochelle was one of the most sought-after suburban communities for home-buyers. Main Street quickly transformed to accommodate the tastes of the community's growing neighborhoods. Along the street that had been lined with wood-frame buildings, more modern structures arose. Designed and built by prominent architects and builders, they reflected a host of elements in the Art Deco style of the day and were constructed with good material, structure, and attention to detail. Downtown New Rochelle was well-posed for the city's glory years during the 1930s, when New Rochelle's population had increased to 54,000 inhabitants in three decades and the city was considered the wealthiest per capita in New York State, and the third wealthiest per capita in the country.

With the development of private vehicular transportation in the following decades, the center pattern began to change. Facilities servicing the automobile, such as gas stations, began to spring up on undeveloped land outside the city center, followed by shopping strips with ample parking space for cars. Downtown areas became increasingly more congested with traffic, and as an answer to the problem, large, decentralized shopping centers were developed. This decline of Main Street was not an overnight event, yet happened gradually, over a period of fifty years. The first commercial strips on the outskirts of the town arrived in the late 1920s, however the greatest blow came after World War II, with the sprawling shopping centers of the 1950s.

Main Street and Downtown continue to be the commercial and retail center of New Rochelle, primarily due to its location along the current Boston Post Road/ New England Thruway/ Metro-North/ Amtrak transportation corridor which crosses the southern section of the city. Increasing numbers of young professionals, families and empty-nesters looking for transit-oriented communities now call the downtown area home.

=== Architecture ===
Much of the architectural detailing along Main Street has survived the years. Main Street between North Avenue and Huguenot Street evokes a strong sense of the 1920s and 30s with multiple structures built in the Art Deco architectural style. New Rochelle's downtown area has the most contiguous group of commercial buildings of this period. Significant buildings include the Bank of New Rochelle Building, the Lambden Building, Talner Jewelers, two historic former theater buildings (RKO and Lowe's), the first suburban branch department store location of both Bloomingdales and Arnold Constable, & Co., and several major Art Deco commercial buildings such as the Kaufman Building, home of the nation's first cartoon studio Terrytoons, and a building associated with one of the nation's first motion picture houses, Thanhouser Company.

== See also ==
- New Rochelle, New York
- New Rochelle Historic Sites
- National Register of Historic Places listings in New Rochelle, New York
