= Residence Park (New Rochelle, New York) =

American planned community established 1885

Coordinates: 40.901°N 73.783°W

- Neighborhood
- Interactive map of Residence Park
- Country: United States
- State: New York
- County: Westchester
- City: New Rochelle
- Time zone: UTC-5:00 (Eastern)
  - Summer (DST): UTC-4:00 (Eastern)
- Area code: 914

Residence Park is a historic community located in the city of New Rochelle, in Westchester County, New York. It is one of the first planned residential parks, and garden city communities, in the United States It is located in the southern section of the city, bordered by Neptune Park on the west, Shore Road and Long Island Sound on the south, and Downtown New Rochelle on the north.

== History ==
Residence Park is situated on the former country estate of the wealthy 19th century New York City hotelier Simeon Leland. Leland, having traveled extensively throughout Europe studying the various hotel systems there, returned with a knowledge and experience that knowledge back to experience effected important changes in American hotel-keeping. The firm Simeon Leland & Company soon grew from a small scale family business with his brothers to a large financial enterprise, with such trophy properties as the Metropolitan Hotel in Manhattan. Smart entrepreneurs capitalized on the need for large, well-staffed and capably managed hotels. The Lelands were partially responsible for initiating and improving this minor revolution in American hotel operation. The sons of the Leland brothers continued the family trade and built a nationwide reputation.

Leland purchased 40 acres overlooking New Rochelle Harbor as the site for his country home, eventually commissioning the architect William Thomas Beers to design a Gothic Revival castle in 1855. Actual construction of “Castle View” did not begin until 1856, when Leland’s increasing success as proprietor of the Metropolitan enabled him to afford the enormous cost of building and decorating his mansion. The sixty room residence Castleview took three years to complete (1856–1859).

Leland apparently was also interested in building up New Rochelle’s resort trade, for in 1861 he purchased Davids Island in Echo Bay, intending to build a hotel there. However, the Civil War intervened, and he leased the island to the Union Army for use as a military hospital. After the war the Lelands sold Davids Island to the government; later it became Fort Slocum.

The Castle was Leland’s vacation home until 1872, when his lease on the Metropolitan Hotel expired. At that time the hotel’s new owner gave its lease to “Boss” William A. Tweed. Leland then retired permanently to New Rochelle and died shortly thereafter on August 3, 1872. Upon his death, Leland was deep in debt. His Castle had reportedly cost $35,000 to erect and was at one time valued at over $100,000. Sometime before his death he was forced to mortgage the entire property, and he died before the mortgage could be paid. Leland supposedly had requested that his wife use his $35,000 insurance policy to settle the mortgage, but for some reason she failed to do so, and the mortgage was foreclosed. Although the Castle was then owned by the Manhattan Life Insurance Company, Mrs. Leland continued to live there until March 1880.

In 1884, Adrian Iselin, Jr., the son of millionaire businessman Charles Oliver Iselin, bought Leland Castle, its 40 acres, and an adjacent farm with the purpose of developing the land into a residential park.

== Planning ==
The Garden City Movement arose in England during the 19th century as a reaction to the crowding and pollution of cities as a result of its Industrial Revolution. While the movement had spread to United States by the 1920s, early residential developers had begun experimenting with the 'Garden City' concept way before it gained the title, including Adrian G Iselin, who planned "Residence Park" in 1885. The neighborhood can be viewed as the grandfather to suburban living in the modern American city. Prior to its existence, residential settings were limited to either very rural or very urban design extremes. Lots were fronted by no more than a ditch or a dirt road when not immediately in the urban environment, and when in the city, there was little to no natural space except for public parks. In Residence Park, specific attention to public spaces, natural settings and visual beauty helped distinguish it from most other suburban developments.

When creating the community, Iselin paid considerable attention to the layout and measurements of streets, the parkways, sidewalks, lighting, greenways, parks, and the overall landscape plan of the community. One of his fundamental goals was to create a community that blended in with the natural topography, designed around large garden areas, landscaped islands and traffic medians, and winding streets.

The community had a strict set of conditions, covenants and restrictions that set minimum property costs, controlled what was built and established property setbacks. The residential architecture reflects several distinct styles popular around the turn of the twentieth century such as Queen Anne Style, Colonial Revival and Tudor. The neighborhood is largely intact today as its layout has not been altered, the landscaping of the common areas has matured, and virtually all the original residences remain.

== Landmarks, sites and attractions ==
Several historically significant structures are located within the area including the former country home of the American patriot and Huguenot Lewis Pintard, a National Historic Landmark. The First Presbyterian Church of New Rochelle is built at the site of the Pintard House, which has been incorporated into the church property as the priory. Pintard founded the Chamber of Commerce of New York and also served General George Washington as Commissary for the prisoners in New York City. His son founded the New York Historical Society, served as secretary of the New York Chamber of Commerce, and was elected first Sagamore of the Tammany Society.

The College of New Rochelle is another significant fixture of the neighborhood. The college's campus encompasses much of the former Leland country estate, and includes the original family residence, "Castleview", a National Historic Landmark.

Additional notable sites include the home of baseball legend Lou Gehrig which is located on Meadow Lane.

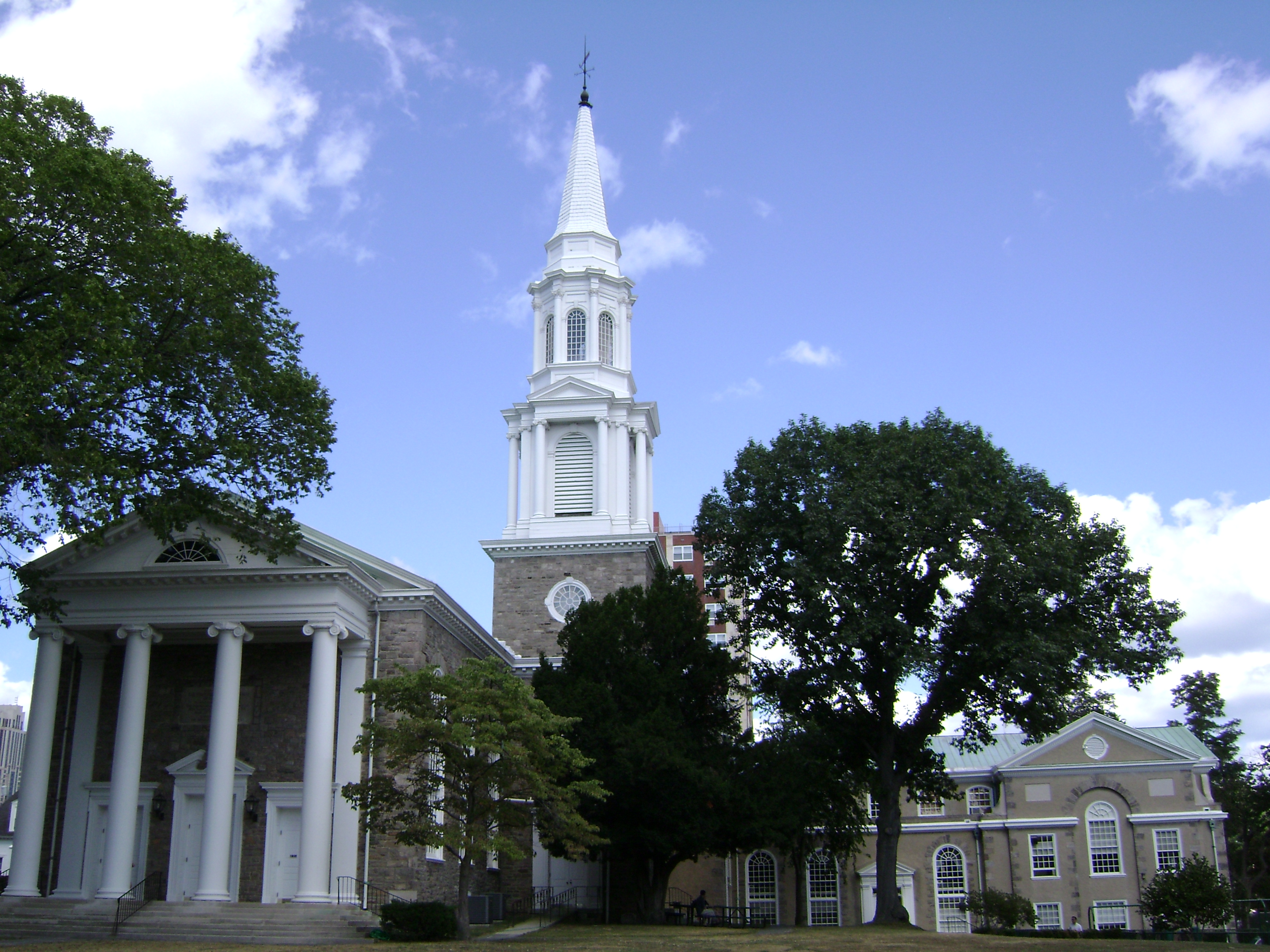
First Presbyterian Church

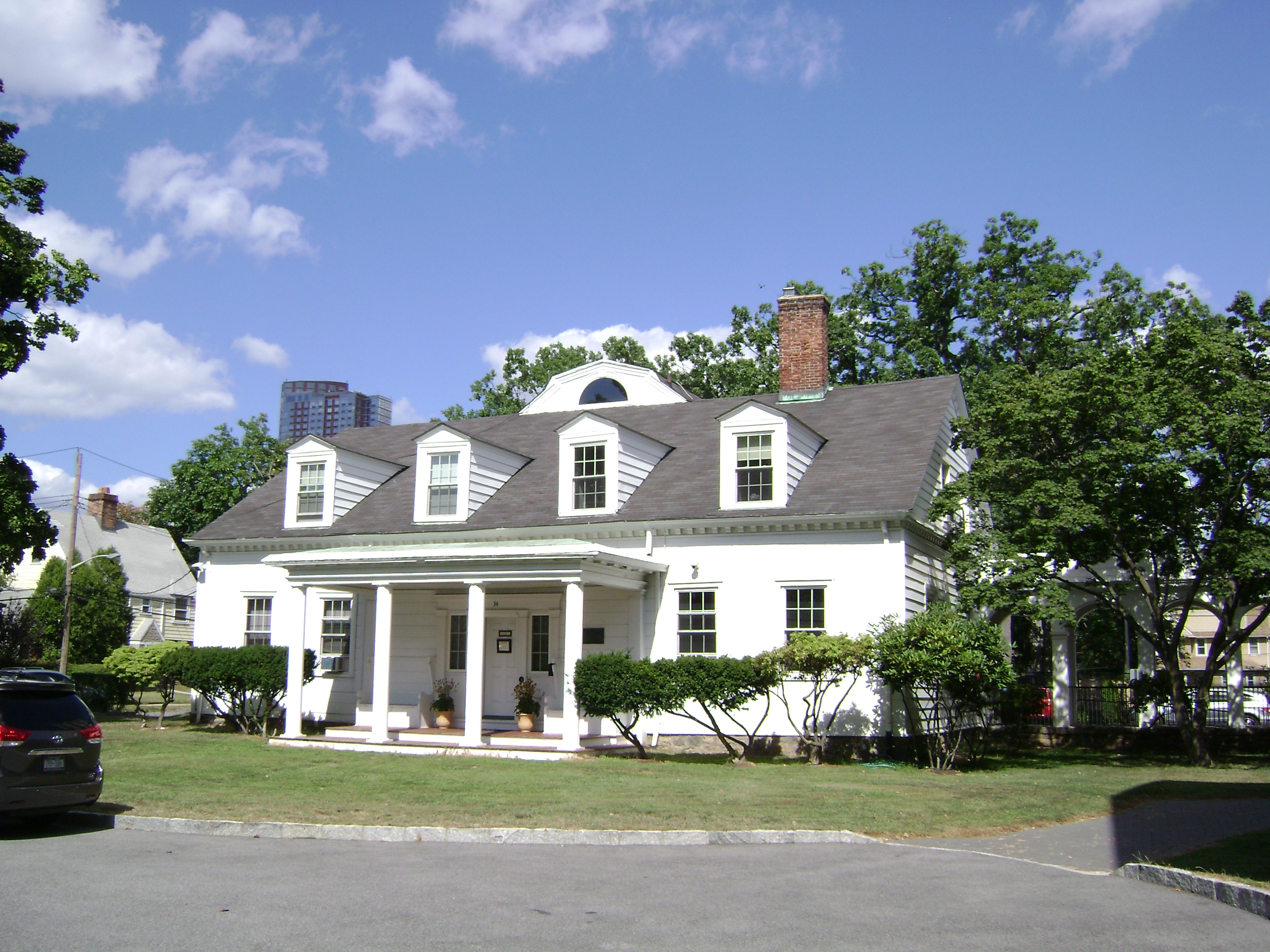
Lewis Pintard House

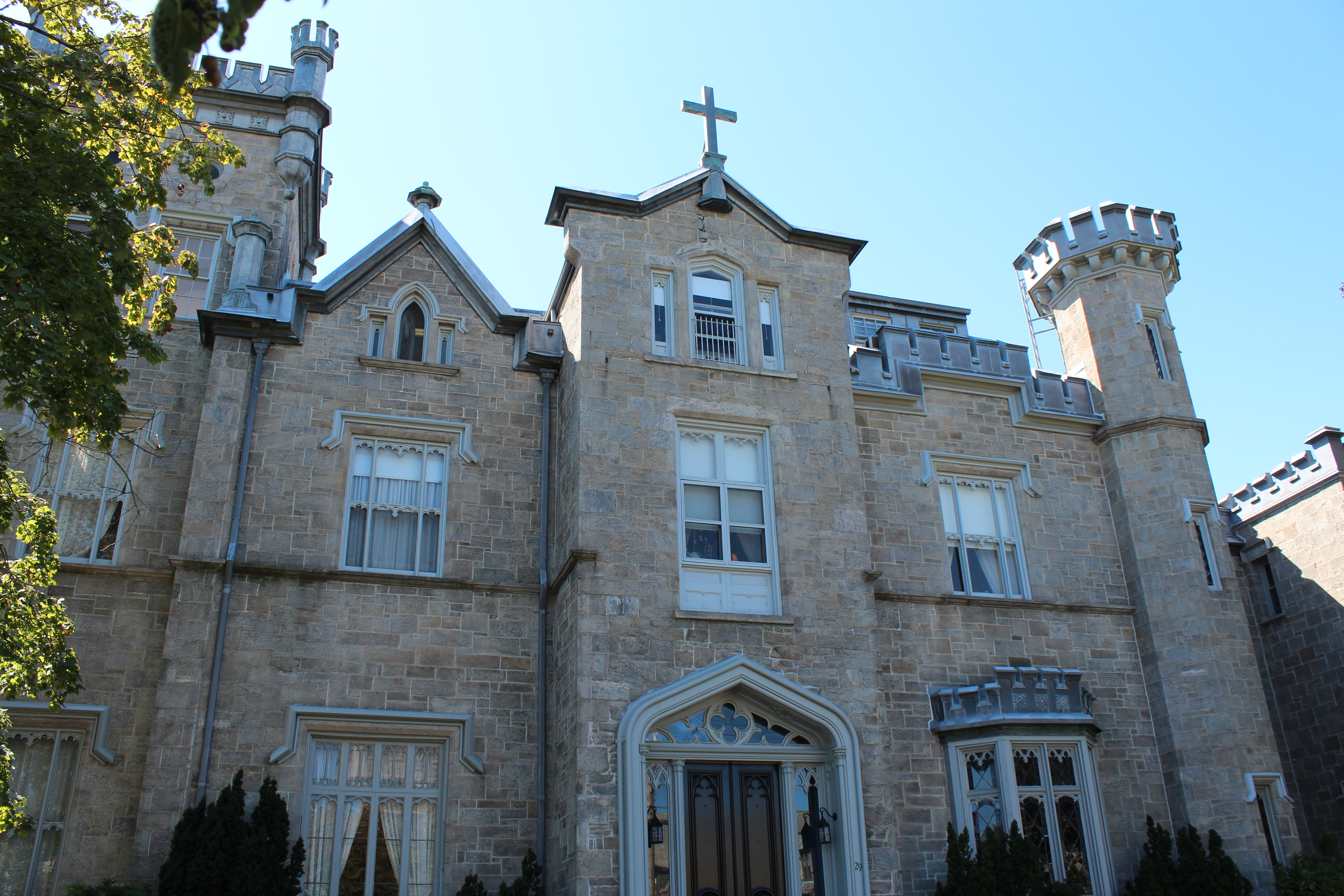
Leland Castle

== See also ==
- U.S. Geological Survey Geographic Names Information System: Residence Park
- NYHomeTownLocator - Community Profile, Residence Park
- NYHometownLocator - MAP, Residence Park
