= Schleifer =

Schleifer (German for 'polisher', 'grinder') is a German-language occupational surname. Its Polonized form is Szlajfer, Russified of Yiddish: Shleifer.

Notable people with this surname include.

- Abdallah Schleifer v S. Abdallah Schleifer (b. Marc Schleifer, 1935–2025), American Middle East expert
- James T. Schleifer a.k.a. James Thomas Schleifer, American historian
- Meyer Schleifer (1908–1994), American bridge player

Schleifer is also the German term for Slide (musical ornament) and the Schleifer dialect, which is transitional between the Upper and Lower Sorbian languages.
