= James T. Schleifer =

American historian

James Thomas Schleifer is an American historian, and emeritus Dean of the Mother Irene Gill Memorial Library, and professor at the College of New Rochelle.

== Life ==
He graduated from Yale University with a Ph.D. in 1972. He also lectures at Yale University.

== Awards ==
- 1981 Merle Curti Award

== Works ==
- "Tocqueville: Écrits et discours politiques". LA REVUE TOCQUEVILLE / THE TOCQUEVILLE REVIEW, VOL. XIII No. 2, 1992
- Eduardo Nolla, ed. (1996). "How Many Democracies?". Liberty, Equality, Democracy. NYU Press. ISBN 978-0-8147-5778-9.
- The making of Tocqueville's Democracy in America. University of North Carolina Press. 1980. ISBN 978-0-8078-1372-0.
- Cheryl B. Welch, ed. (2006). "Tocqueville's Democracy in America Reconsidered". The Cambridge Tocqueville Companion. Cambridge University Press. ISBN 978-0-521-84064-4.
