= Mother Irene Gill Memorial Library =

Library in New Rochelle, New York, U.S.

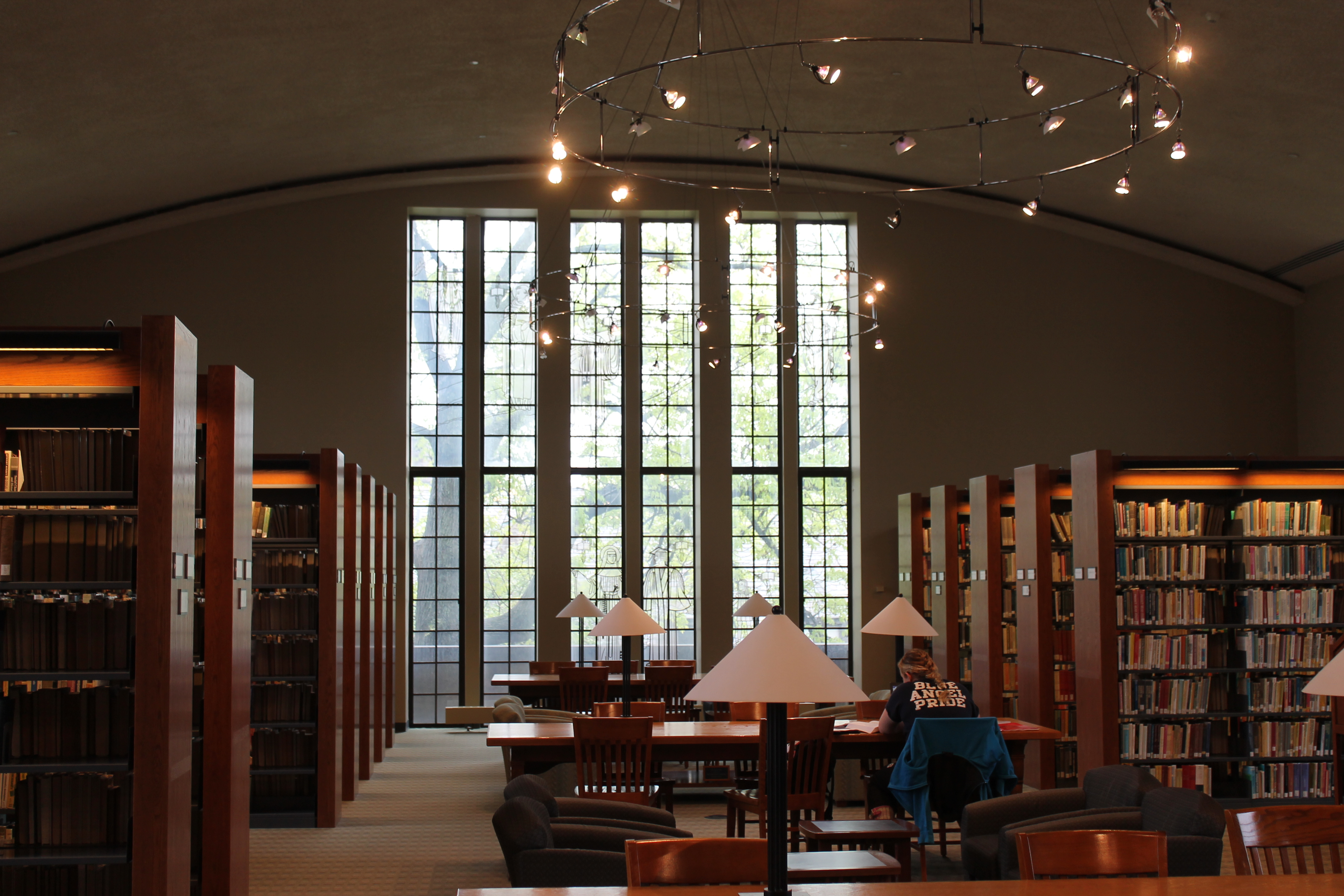
- College of New Rochelle Gill Memorial Library
- Location: Castle Road, New Rochelle, New York, United States
- Type: Academic library
- Established: 20th century
- Branches: 5

Collection
- Items collected: Books, journals, newspapers, magazines, sound and music recordings, videos, maps
- Size: 250,000 items (approx.)
- Legal deposit: No

Access and use
- Population served: College of New Rochelle

Other information
- Director: Ana Fontoura, Dean of Libraries
- Website: http://www2.cnr.edu/home/library/index.htm

Mother Irene Gill Memorial Library was the centrally administered library of the College of New Rochelle in New York. It comprised the main college library and five affiliated libraries:

- Co-Op City
- Brooklyn
- John Cardinal O'Connor in the South Bronx
- Rosa Parks in Harlem
- District Council 37 in TriBeca

== History ==
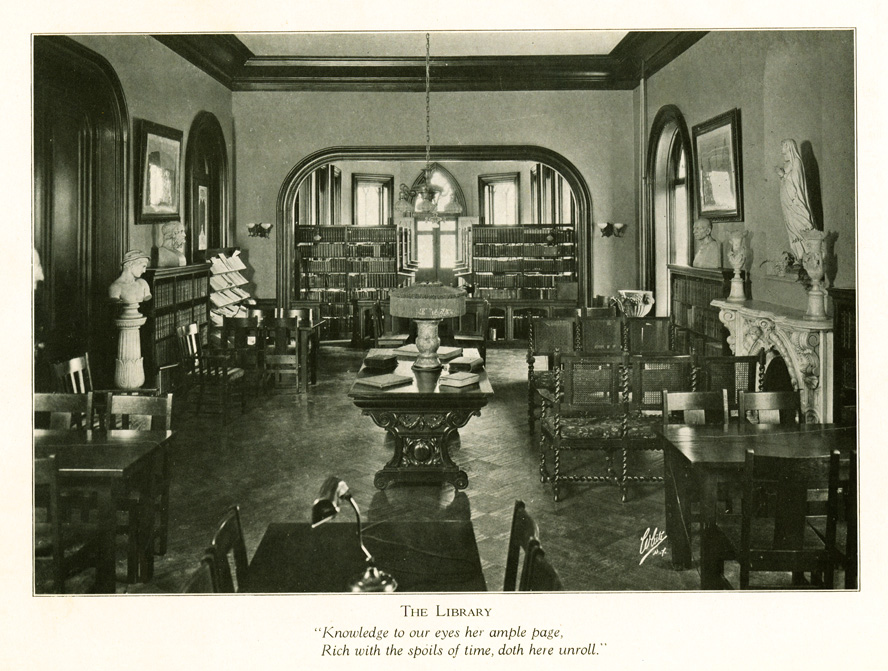
The Gill Memorial Library, ca. 1910.

The first library was located in the original library room of historic Leland Castle. It then expanded into a larger space on the same floor until 1923 when the library was moved into space formerly occupied by the chapel on the second floor of the 1901 wing of Leland Castle. Later it moved to bigger quarters on the third floor. The 1939 new building, dedicated to CNR founder, Mother M. Irene Gill, O.S.U. had both an exhibit room and auditorium/lecture hall on the ground floor. On the second floor, a large stained glass window, the “Transmission of Knowledge,” was installed in the Main Reading Room.

In addition to its role as a campus library, the Gill Library has served as an art gallery, supplementing the work of the Castle Gallery The library also promoted literature for the community by hosting a series of poetry readings. As well as classic library services such as reference, special collections and periodical access, the library has been active in developing an information literacy curriculum with for-credit classes. Due to the demographics of CNR enrollment, the library has made a special effort to meet the needs of adult learners. The library collections' strengths include a major collection of titles in the bibliotherapy of grieving. In 2013 the library worked with Google to create The Catholic Node for Research, a custom search of preferred sites for Catholic information. They also worked with Google to adapt a world map to provide a country-by-country interface to the library's catalog. In 2014, the College of New Rochelle was awarded two grants totalling 14 million dollars from the Department of Education to develop innovative ways to improve graduation rates. Much of this funding went to the Gill Library to develop Learning Commons centers in all CNR locations. Librarians at Gill have been active in professional writing with numerous articles and several books in preparation. The library created an initiative to display the scholarship of its faculty and students in 2015.

== Architecture ==
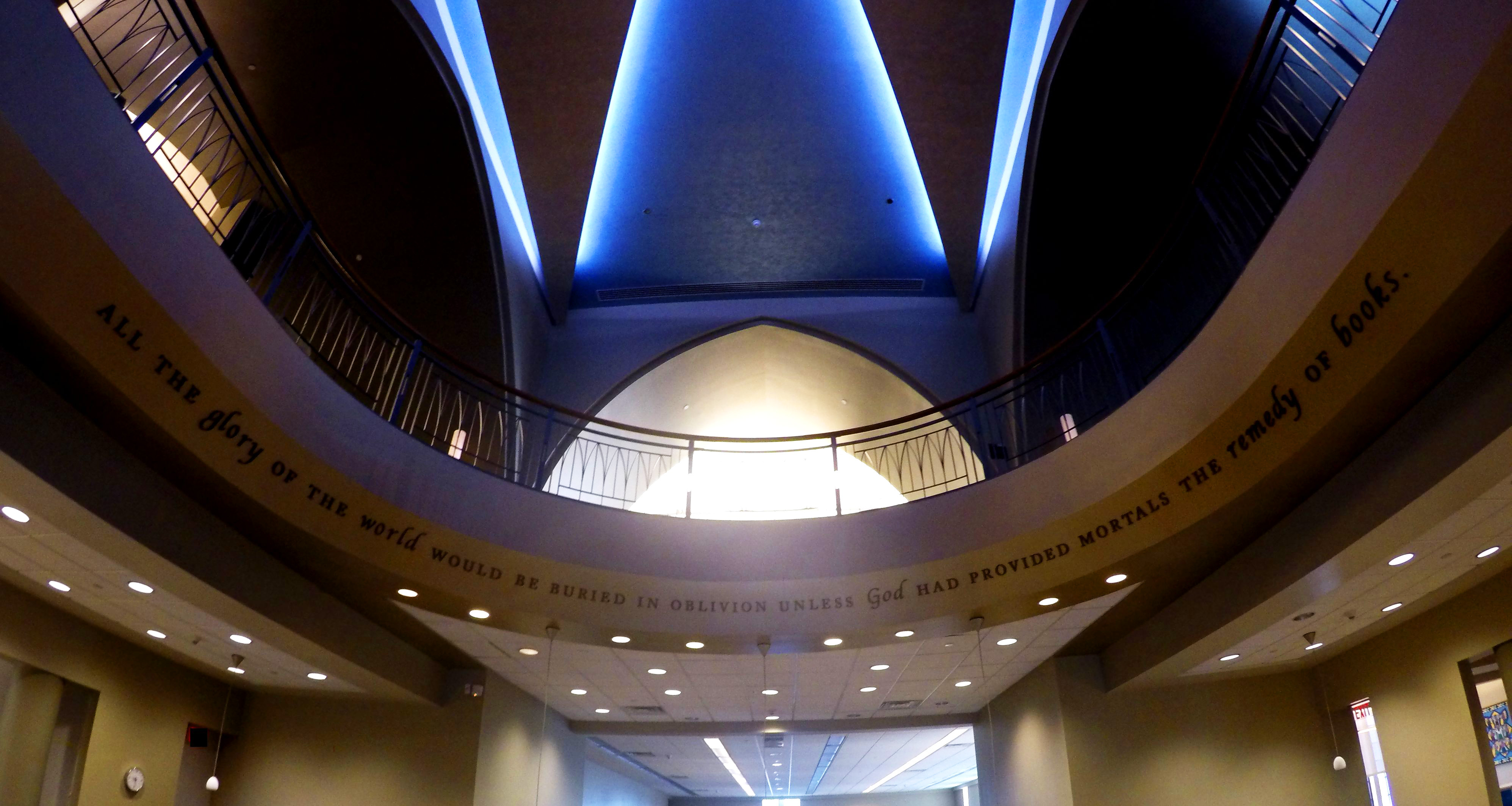
Library rotunda

The current library building was opened in 1939. At the time it was described as "the last word in library planning." The college hired the architectural firm of Voorhees, Walker, Foley & Smith of New York City. The builders were M. Bartnett and Sons of New Rochelle. Then, as now, a figure of Saint Angela Merici is sculpted in high relief over the main entrance. This work was commissioned to Janet de Coux, one of the leading sculptors of the day. Inside, one sees this inscription from Richard de Bury over the Reference Desk: "ALL THE GLORY OF THE WORLD WOULD BE BURIED IN OBLIVION, UNLESS GOD HAD PROVIDED MORTALS THE REMEDY OF BOOKS."

== Special collections ==
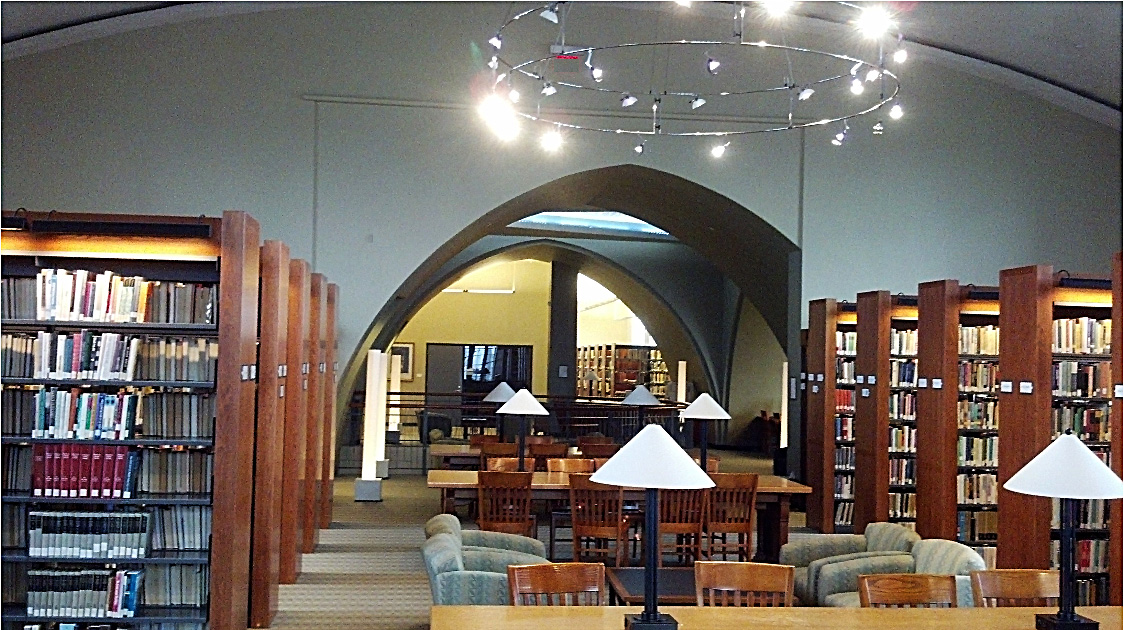
The library's Main Reading Room on the 2nd floor.

As part of its collection of more than 250,000 volumes, the library contains a wealth of material from earlier times. This includes:

- The Ursuline Collection
- The James Joyce Collection
- The Thomas More Collection
- An archive of CNR history

In 2014 the library partnered with the Catholic Research Resources Alliance, headquartered at Notre Dame University to add more than 500 records describing the library's Ursuline collection to the CRRA union catalog.

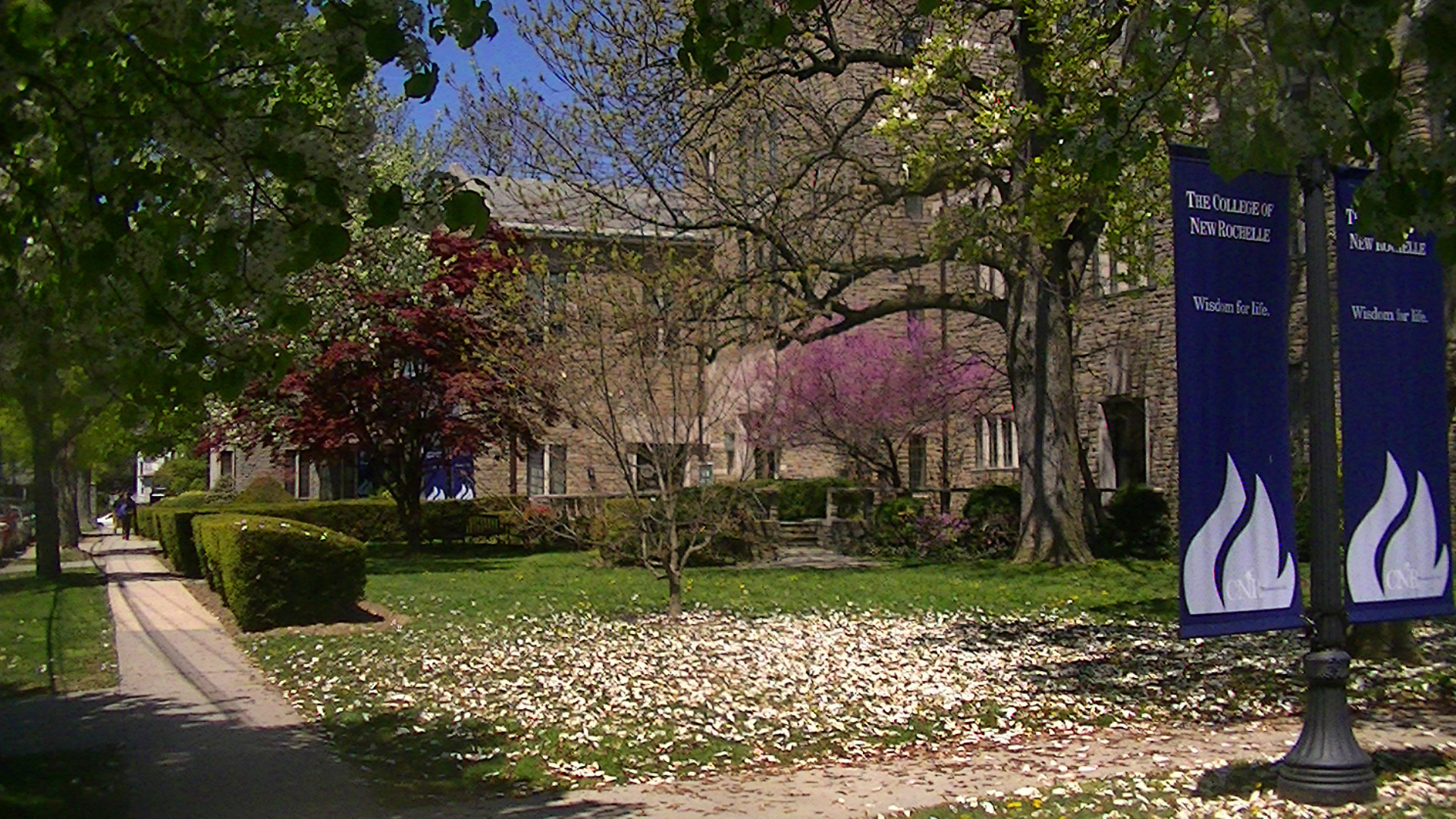
The Gill Memorial Library.

== Digitization projects ==
In 2013 the Gill Library received a grant to partner with Manhattanville College for the creation of a digitized account of the history of the National Federation of Catholic College Students. Early in 2014, the library digitized the last known copy in existence of the book Spiritual exercises for postulants of the Ursuline Order at the reception of the holy habit. In the fall of 2014, the library created an online memorial to Mary Dora Rogick, a very distinguished biologist who taught at the College of New Rochelle from the 1930s until her death in 1964. The memorial includes links to her scientific publications and correspondence, as well as examples of her light-hearted cartoons about campus life in New Rochelle. A number of new digitization initiatives were launched since 2014, using the state-of-the-art equipment provided by the grant. These include digitized yearbooks, as well as a master index to the names of alumnae in the yearbooks a history of the library in photographs historic postcards of the CNR campus, and a Centennial publication for the college. Late in 2014, the library published a color high-definition map of New Rochelle from 1867. In 2015, the library spearheaded an effort to highlight full text articles from faculty, staff and students in a digital repository developed by Bepress. In 2016, the library created an online site for the papers of Sister Alice Gallin, OSU, a distinguished alumna and former administrator at the College of New Rochelle.

== Bibliography ==
- Counihan, Martha. Simeon Leland's Castle at New Rochelle. University of Delaware Thesis, Newark, Del., 1973
