= Trump Plaza (New Rochelle) =

High-rise building in New York state

Trump Plaza New Rochelle
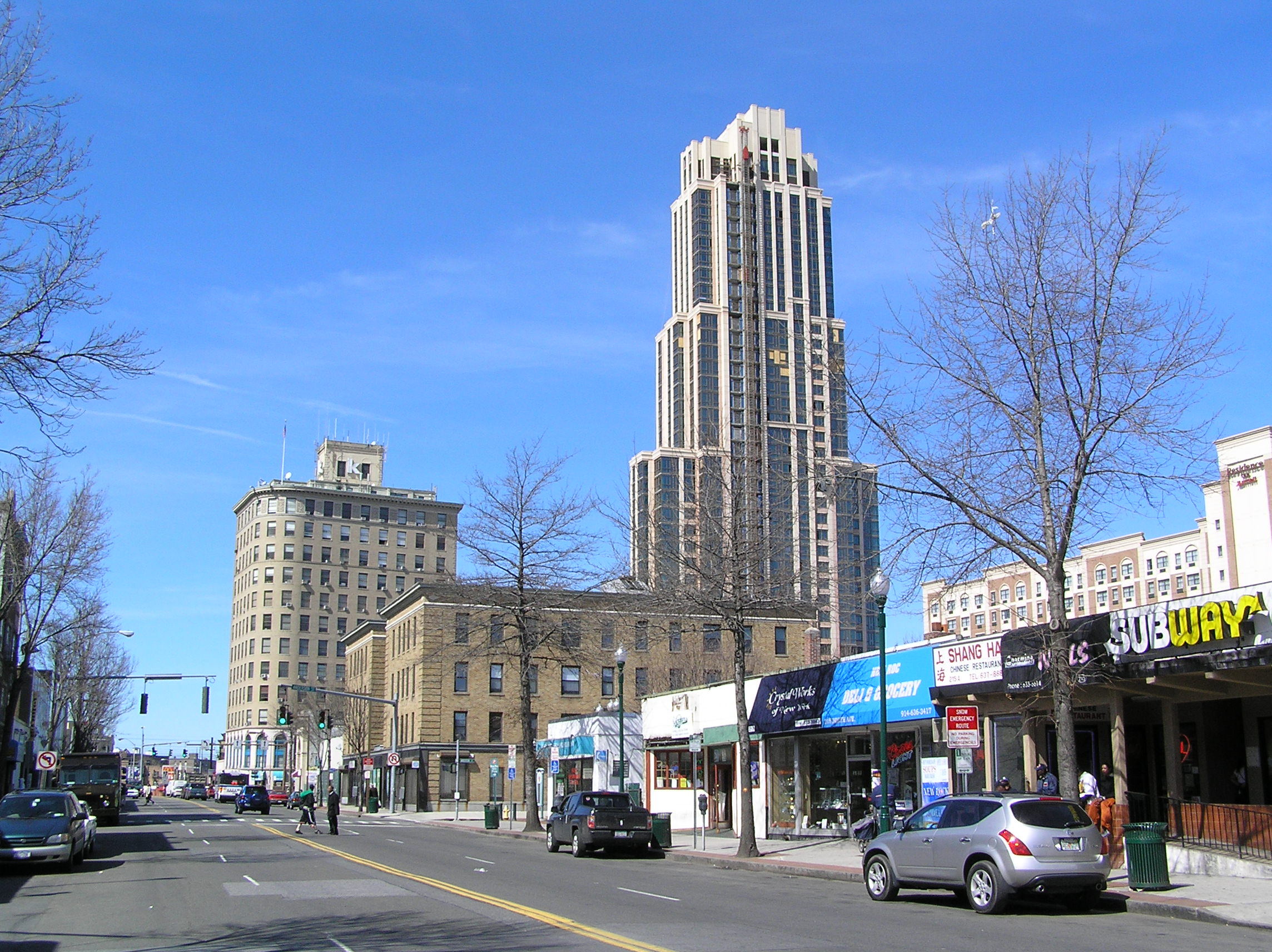
- Interactive map of the Trump Plaza New Rochelle area

General information
- Status: Completed
- Type: Residential condominium
- Architectural style: Postmodern
- Location: 175 Huguenot Street, New Rochelle, New York, United States
- Coordinates: 40°54′45″N 73°46′53″W
- Construction started: 2005
- Completed: 2007
- Cost: $250,000,000
- Owner: New Roc Parcel 1A, LLC

Height
- Height: 435 feet (133 m)

Technical details
- Floor count: 40

Design and construction
- Architect: Lessard Design Inc.

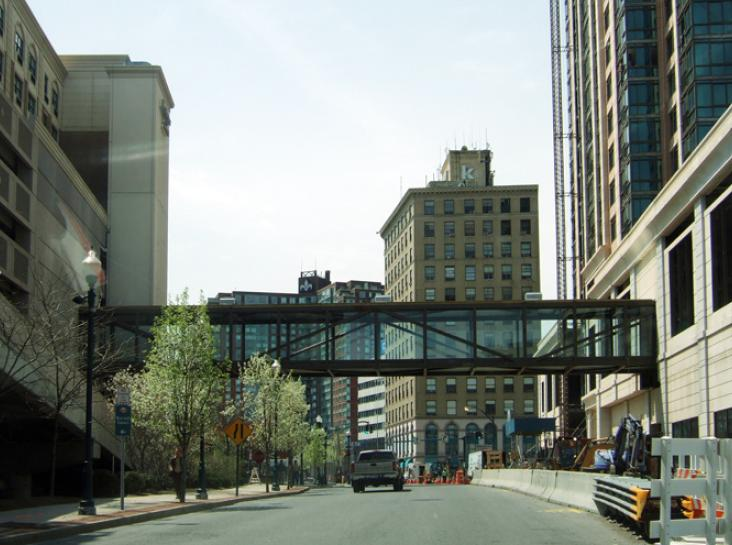
Pedestrian bridge connecting Trump Plaza to New Roc City

Trump Plaza New Rochelle is a 40-story luxury condo building located in New Rochelle, NY. The Trump Organization no longer manages the property after its services were terminated by the Condo Board in October 2021, and the building is now managed by AKAM Associates.

Trump Plaza New Rochelle was built by Cappelli Enterprises, the same developer that built Trump Tower at City Center in nearby White Plains. Trump Plaza was the tallest building in Westchester County and the tallest building between New York City and Albany until the completion of the 44-story, twin-towered Ritz-Carlton hotel in White Plains.

Trump Plaza is part of a massive downtown redevelopment project that began with the construction of New Roc City in 1999. The project encompasses Parcel 1A and the Lawton Street Redevelopment block known as Le Count Square. Located at 175 Huguenot Street, Trump Plaza is built on the 2-acre (8,100 m^{2}), Parcel 1A site which the City of New Rochelle had sought to redevelop for more than 30 years. In 2008 Cappelli Enterprises will begin development of 'Le Count Square' opposite Trump Plaza, adding 1,000,000 square feet (93,000 m^{2}) of hotel, office, retail and residential space to the area. With the development of Trump Plaza and LeCount Square, Cappelli's total investment in downtown New Rochelle will exceed $1 billion.

The 353,600-square-foot (32,850 m^{2}) Trump Plaza consists of 138,000 square feet (12,800 m^{2}) of retail space on two levels at its base, topped with a luxury condominium tower. Trump Plaza rises more than 435 feet (133 m) over downtown New Rochelle. The retail portion of the project is linked to New Roc City by an enclosed pedestrian bridge.

== Incidents ==
On September 17, 2019 a car plowed into the lobby of the building at around 8:40pm EST. 3 people were injured.
