= Shleifer =

Shleifer is a form of the German surname Schleifer. Notable people with the surname include:

- Andrei Shleifer (born 1961), Russian-American economist
- Scott Shleifer (born 1977), American billionaire hedge fund manager
- Shlomo Shleifer (1889–1957), Rabbi from Moscow
