= New Rochelle Mall =

- Location: New Rochelle, New York, United States
- Coordinates: 40°54′40″N 73°46′46″W
- Address: Main Street and Le Count Place
- Opened: 1968
- Closed: 1995 (demolished spring 1998)
- Num. of stores: 100
- Num. of anchor tenants: 1
- Floor area: 600,000 sq ft (56,000 m^{2})
- Floors: 3

New Rochelle Mall was an enclosed shopping mall located in the downtown business district of the suburban city of New Rochelle, Westchester County, New York. The clearing of the site on which the mall was built began in the mid-1960s as part of a downtown urban renewal project. Numerous homes, some businesses, and a cemetery and church were cleared away to create a four-blocks-long lot upon which the mall would be sited.The mall had its grand opening in 1968 and was initially a great success, attracting shoppers from across lower Westchester. A period of decline began in the 1980s, and the mall was shuttered in 1995, with the entire structure being demolished in 1998 and soon thereafter replaced by an entertainment center called New Roc City.

The mall complex covered four large downtown blocks and was composed of 100 retail shops covering 338,000 square feet (31,400 m^{2}), a three-level, 250,000-square-foot (23,000 m^{2}) department store, and a 1,900-car garage. It also included a 1204-seat Century Mall Theater as well as being linked to an adjacent eight-story office building and hotel tower, both of which still remain.

Plans were in the works for the mall to undergo a $30 million, 50 percent expansion, with the addition of a 12-story building that was to include a 12-screen movie theater and eight floors of offices. The expansion, intended to aid in the revitalization of New Rochelle's downtown, was scheduled for completion in 1991. Those developments were later dropped and never completed.

The mall's end came with the bankruptcy of Macy's and its closing of the New Rochelle branch in 1992. The vacancy rate in the mall by then was already high, and the mall was formally closed and demolished by spring 1998. It was eventually replaced by the New Roc City entertainment complex which opened in 1999. New Roc features a 19-screen movie theater, Westchester County's first IMAX theater (preceding White Plains City Center's Cinema de Lux), a health club, an ice rink (now Monroe College Athletic Center), restaurants, shopping centers and an indoor amusement park.
