= Simeon Leland =

New York businessman, hotelier (died 1872)

Simeon Leland (November 1812 – August 5, 1872) was a New York businessman and hotelier during the late 19th century. He made his wealth while operating the Metropolitan Hotel located on fashionable Broadway in lower Manhattan. Opened in 1852 to cater to travelers and residents who wanted to enjoy luxuries like bathrooms, running water, elevators, and fine dining, the Metropolitan attracted many Southern businessmen and their families who often came to New York in the summer to escape the extreme heat of the South.

Leland also began assembling an estate around this time, first purchasing a 40-acre property in New Rochelle overlooking Long Island Sound in 1848. Like many successful New York businessmen at that time, he took advantage of the railroads' development into the rural areas out of the city, carefully planning and designing a country residence for graceful and stylish living. In 1855, he began the erection his palatial 60-room, Gothic mansion, "Castle View", which took almost five years to complete. Just as he was famous for his well-run and fashionable Metropolitan Hotel, Leland's home became equally famous as he entertained there regularly.

New Yorkers were not enthusiastic backers of the American Civil War, knowing that it would adversely affect commerce and New York hotels in particular. As a way to offset his losses, Leland had leased and then purchased Davids Island near his New Rochelle home, purportedly for a hotel, but his financial reverses forced him to lease, and then sell the island to the US government in 1862, where a military hospital was established.

In 1864, Simeon Leland and his brothers took over the management of the Union Hotel in Saratoga Springs, New York, the popular spa and resort for wealthy and an American equivalent to the famous water spas of Europe. In their famous lavish style, they redecorated the hotel and hosted nightly entertainments, balls, and fireworks displays to entertain their hotel guests and others. Many Union generals and officers were entertained at the Union Hotel. Unfortunately, a combination of factors including over-investment in the hotel, and economic downturn in New York City due to the war, pushed the Leland brothers into bankruptcy following the Civil War. Leland died on August 5, 1872. Castleview eventually became the College of St. Angela, the first Catholic women’s college in New York, which was the College of New Rochelle until 2019.
