= First Presbyterian Church and Lewis Pintard House =

Historic church in New York, United States

- U.S. National Register of Historic Places
- New York State Register of Historic Places
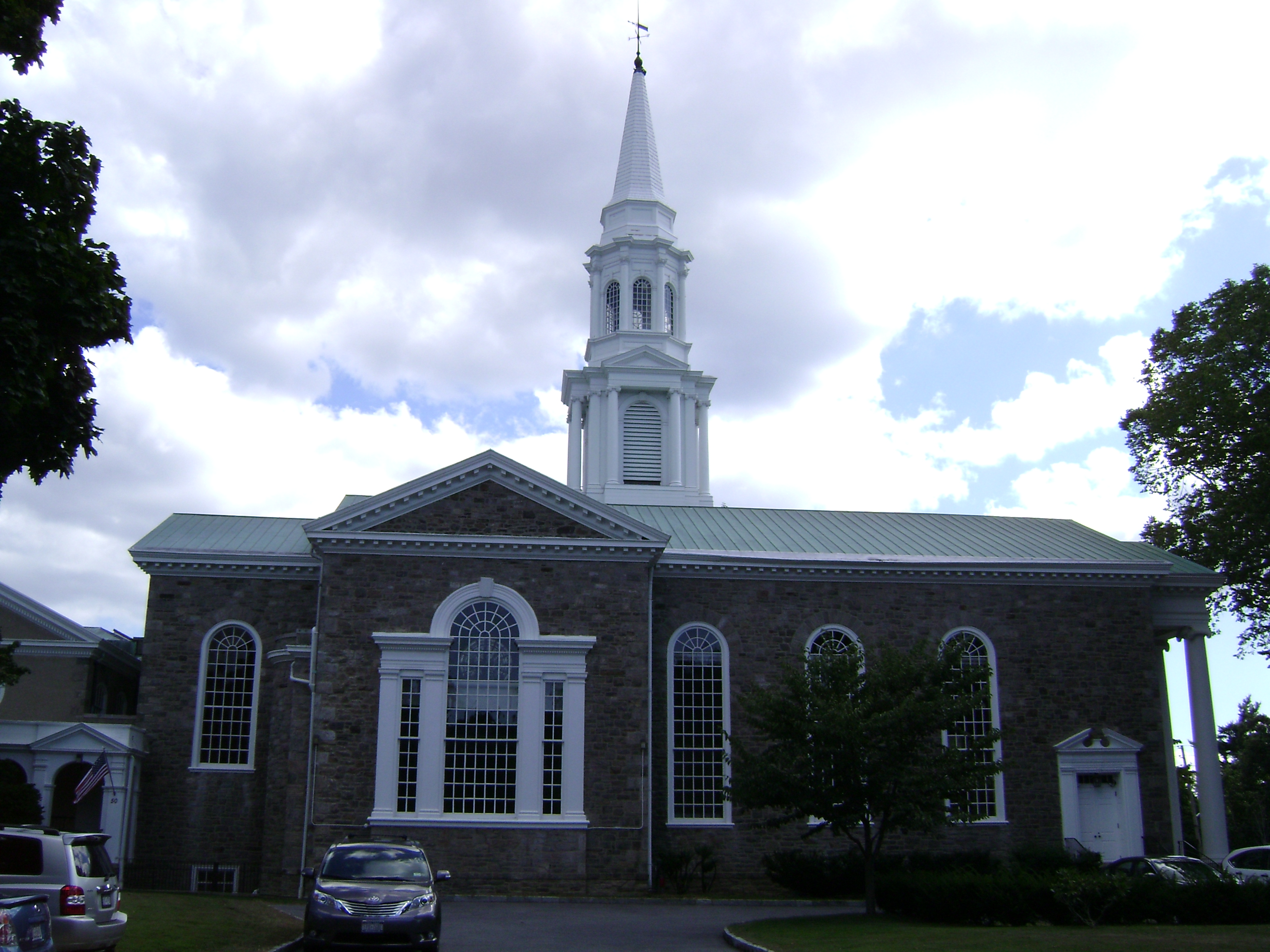
- Side of the First Presbyterian Church

- Location within New York Location within the United States
- Location: Pintard Ave., New Rochelle, New York
- Coordinates: 40°54′16″N 73°47′7″W
- Area: 3 acres (12,000 m^{2})
- Built: 1710
- Architect: John Russell Pope
- Architectural style: Colonial Revival
- NRHP reference No.: 79001648
- NYSRHP No.: 11942.000748

Significant dates
- Added to NRHP: September 07, 1979
- Designated NYSRHP: June 23, 1980

The First Presbyterian Church and Lewis Pintard House is a pair of adjacent historic buildings in downtown New Rochelle, New York, United States. The church and its adjoining manse, the Pintard House, are on a 3-acre (1.2 ha) lot. It was listed on the National Register of Historic Places in 1979.

The First Presbyterian Church had its origins as the French Church formed by New Rochelle's early Huguenot settlers. The church is a Colonial Revival structure with granite quoins, designed by John Russell Pope, architect of the Jefferson Memorial. Completed in 1929, it replaced the congregation's first church, which had been destroyed by fire.

Adjacent to the church building is the Pintard House, one of New Rochelle's oldest remaining houses. It was constructed in part by Alexander Allaire sometime before 1710. In 1765 it became the home of a prominent New York City merchant named Pierre Vallade who came to New Rochelle on his retirement. After Vallade died in 1770, his widow married Lewis Pintard, whose name came to be associated with the house. Pintard was a local merchant and Revolutionary War patriot who was appointed by the Continental Congress to provide assistance to American prisoners held in the City of New York during British control. The Pintard House was moved to its current location in 1928.

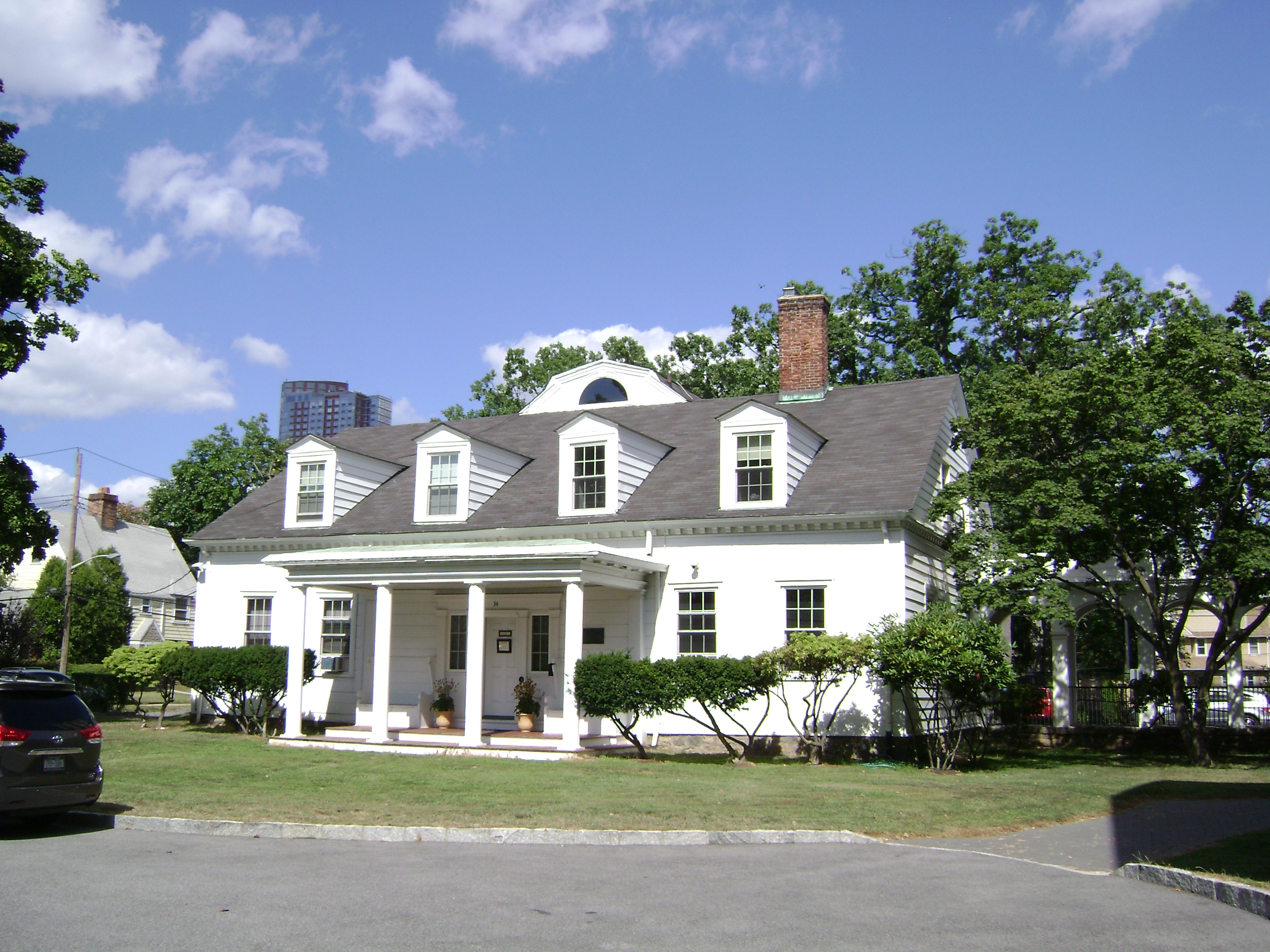
Lewis Pintard House
