= New Roc City =

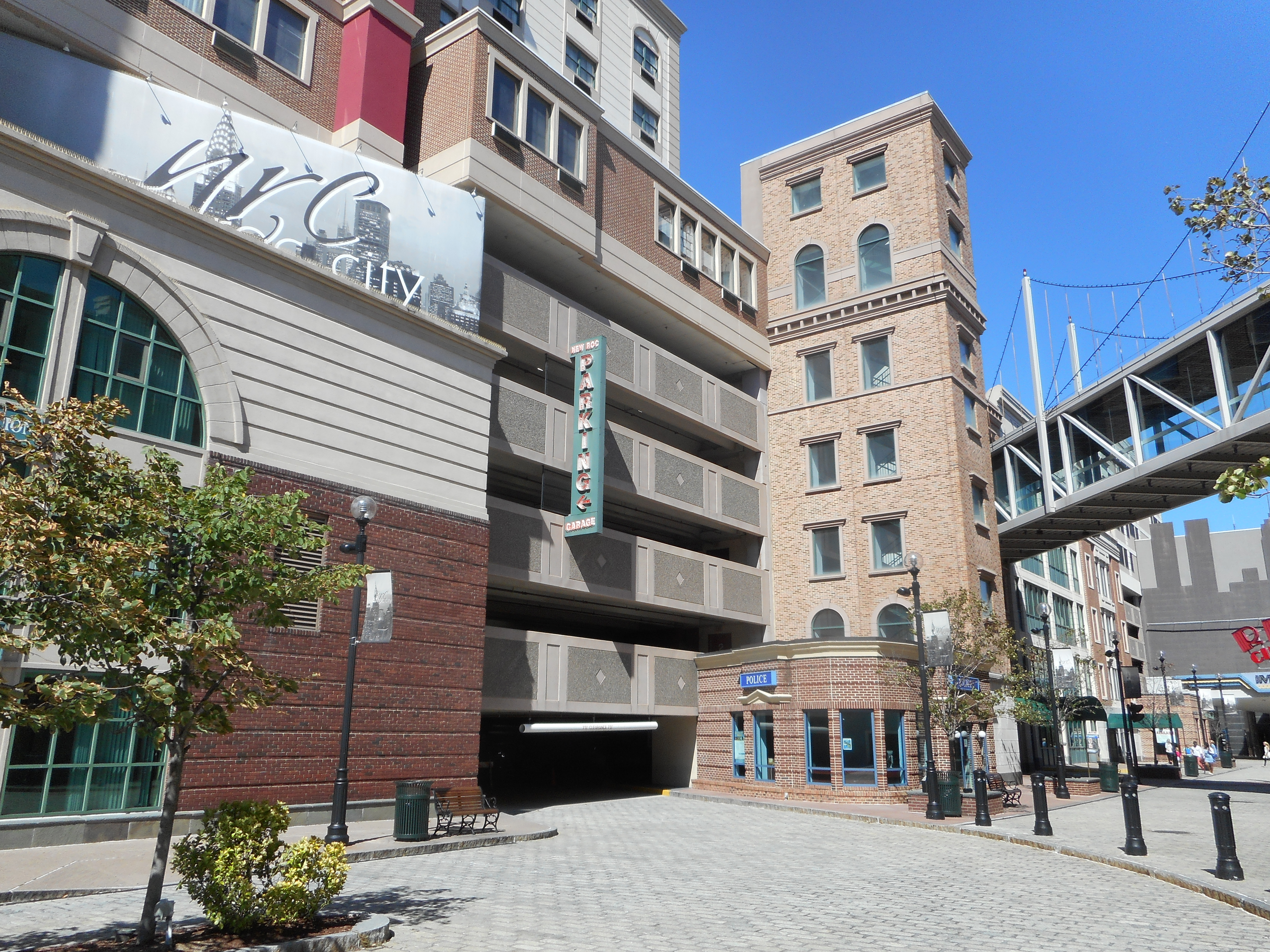
- New Roc City and New Rochelle police station
- Location: New Rochelle, New York, United States
- Opened: 1999
- Developer: Cappelli
- Manager: New Roc Associates
- Owner: New Roc Associates
- Website: www.newroccity.com

New Roc City, also known as New Rochelle Center or simply New Roc, is an entertainment, retail and residential complex in the Downtown section of the city of New Rochelle in Westchester County, New York. It is located at 33 LeCount Place, between Main Street North and Main Street South. The center was built on the site of the former New Rochelle Mall, which closed in 1992.

== History ==
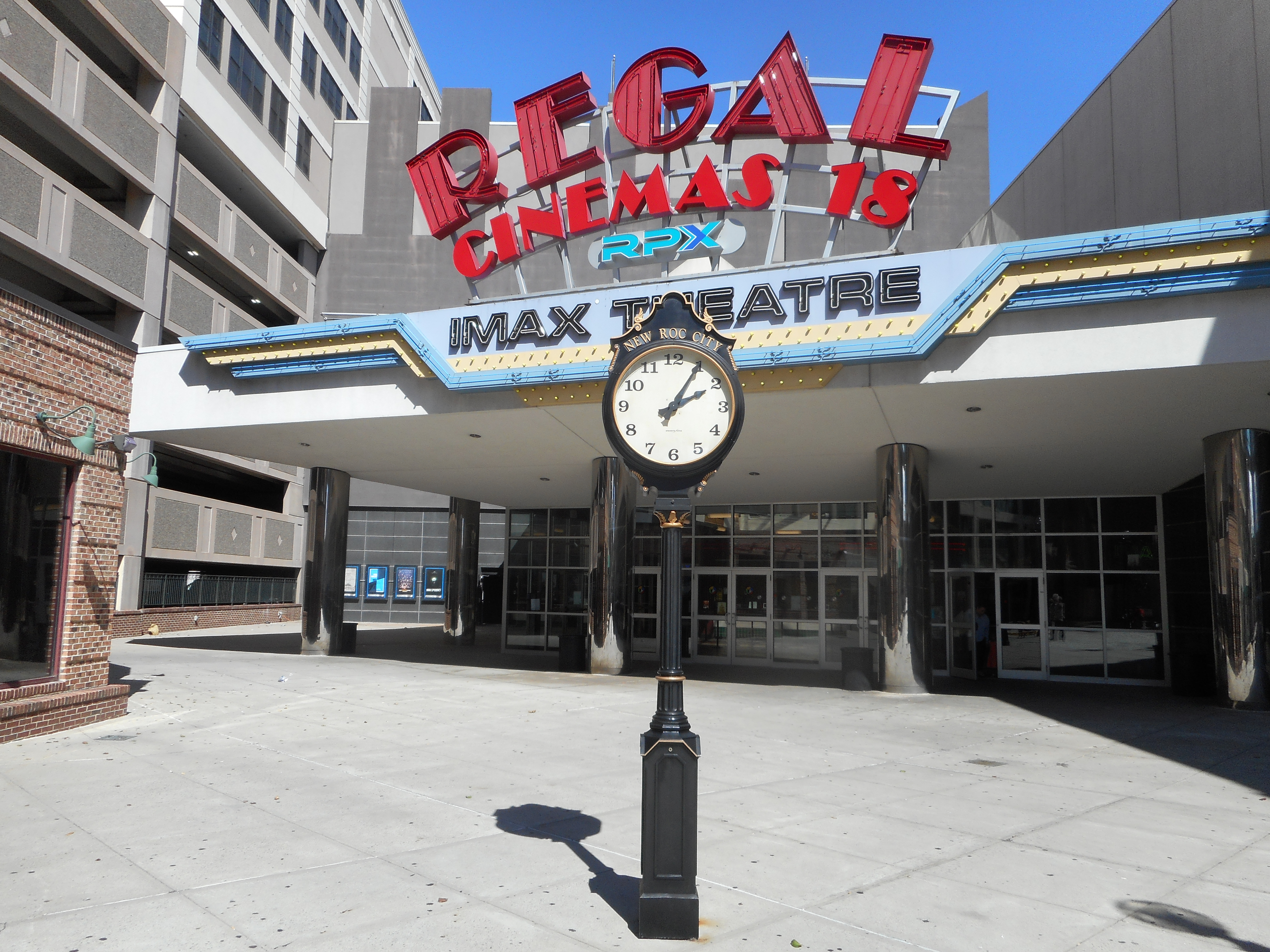
Electrictime clock in front of IMAX Theater

Unable to attract a new anchor once Macy's had left, the New Rochelle Mall shut down in 1995, creating a chasm in the city's center. New Roc City which opened in the summer of 1999, was developed as the centerpiece of the efforts to revitalize the downtown business area of New Rochelle. The 1,200,000-square-foot (110,000 m^{2}) project cost $190 million and featured a 19-screen movie theater, Westchester County's first IMAX theater (preceding White Plains City Center's Cinema de Lux), a health club, an ice rink (now Monroe College Athletic Center), restaurants, shopping centers and an indoor amusement park.

New Roc began a major conversion into a retail-based complex beginning in May 2008. It was rumored that the new retail stores to occupy New Roc would be Target and Kohl's. Best Buy, for a while, was also rumored to be another planned store. The space is currently occupied by Planet Fitness. New Roc now houses Monroe College's Athletic Complex and student cafeteria.

== Design ==
The core and shell architecture for New Roc City was designed by the White Plains, New York-based architecture firm Peg Park LLC. PEG Park was also the architect of record for this project. Design for the exterior facades and the interiors of arcade was done by Haverson Architecture & Design from Greenwich, Connecticut. At the request of the developer Louis Capelli, the facades were designed to resemble classic New York City buildings. Originally, what is now the Speedway was a second ice skating rink themed to look like Central Park. When viewed from this rink, the second and third floors were given faux detailing to mimic the riveted steel construction seen at Grand Central Station. The third floor arcades were themed to look like NYC rooftops. Murals depicting the surrounding NYC skyline surround the whole third floor. Faux brick and stone parapet walls along with dramatic lighting enhance the rooftop effect.

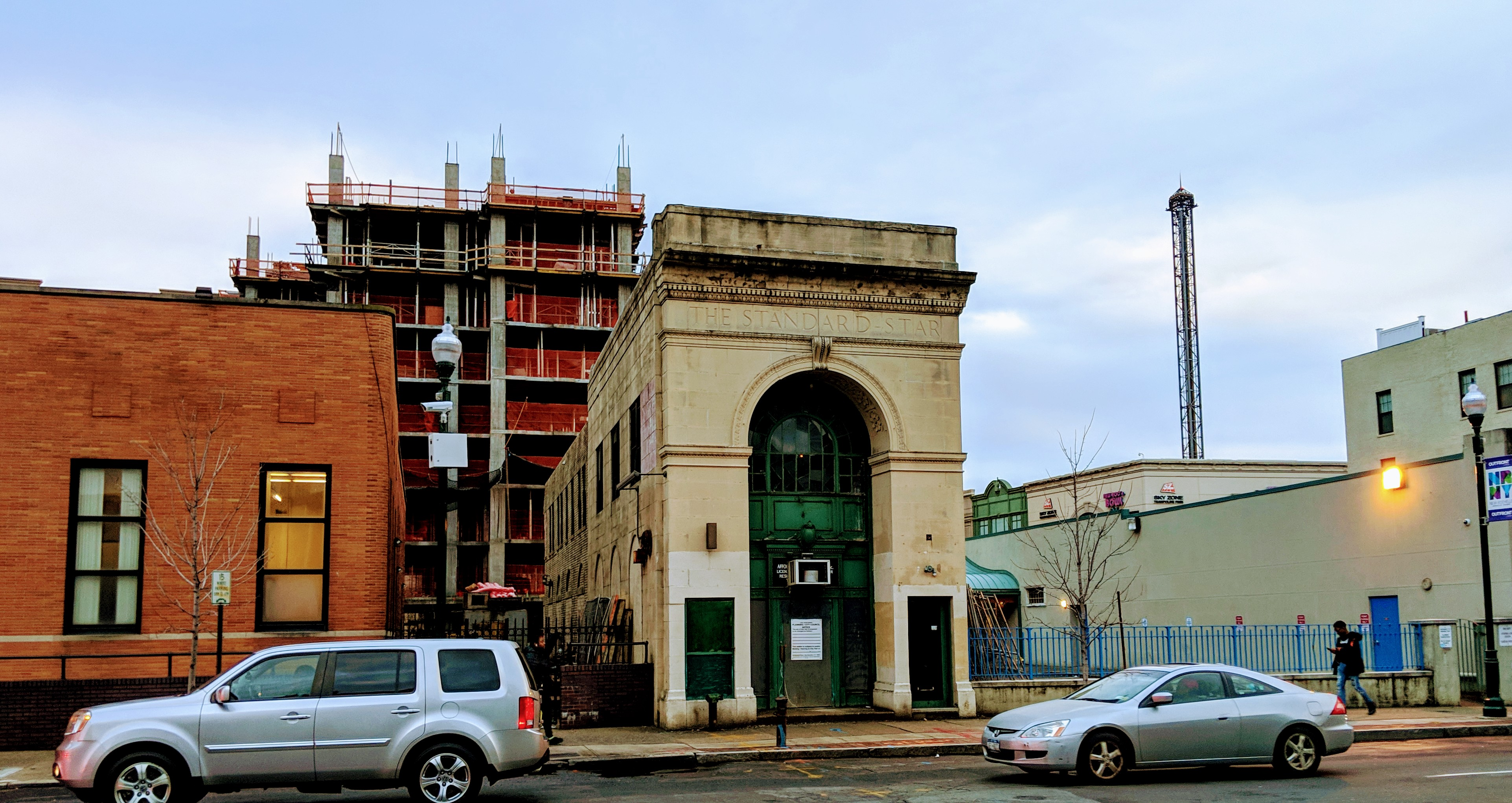
Standard Star bldg & Space Shot amusement ride

Atop New Roc City, in the center of the arcade, is an amusement ride called the Space Shot. Manufactured by S&S - Sansei Technologies, it is a 185' tall 8'x 8' wide tower with 12 seats on a roller assembly attached to the outside of the tower. The ride is powered by hydraulic pistons and shoots riders to the top of the tower in less than 3 seconds, offering a stomach churning thrill, as well as brief views of the Long Island Sound and the surrounding areas.

The complex also contains a Regal Cinemas multiplex and IMAX theater, bowling alley, 25-table billiards hall, electric go-kart track, a glow in the dark miniature golf course, an arcade with over 300 games and rides, a Marriott Residence Inn, a fitness center, EastWest Karate Jujitsu, and an ice cream cafe. 'The Lofts at New Roc' apartment complex is also attached to the main complex structure.

In 2019, the city had approved proposals to replace the Stop & Shop Supermarket for an Audi car dealership expected to open sometime in 2021. On February 28, 2020, the Stop and Shop supermarket had closed for business, and was replaced with a new location for Audi New Rochelle. Modell's also closed after the chain's liquidation the same year.

=== Anchors ===
- Residence Inn by Marriott - 125 suite hotel

=== Restaurants ===
- Applebee's Neighborhood Grill & Bar
- Buffalo Wild Wings
- Burger King

=== Residences ===
- The Lofts at New Roc - rental building with 100 loft style apartments
- The Summit at New Roc

== Tenants ==
The Japanese Weekend School of New York, a Japanese supplementary weekend school, has its offices in Suite 204 in New Roc City. As of 2006 the school had about 800 students, including Japanese citizens and Japanese Americans, at locations in Westchester County and Long Island.
