= Leland Castle =

Historic house in New York, United States

- U.S. National Register of Historic Places
- New York State Register of Historic Places
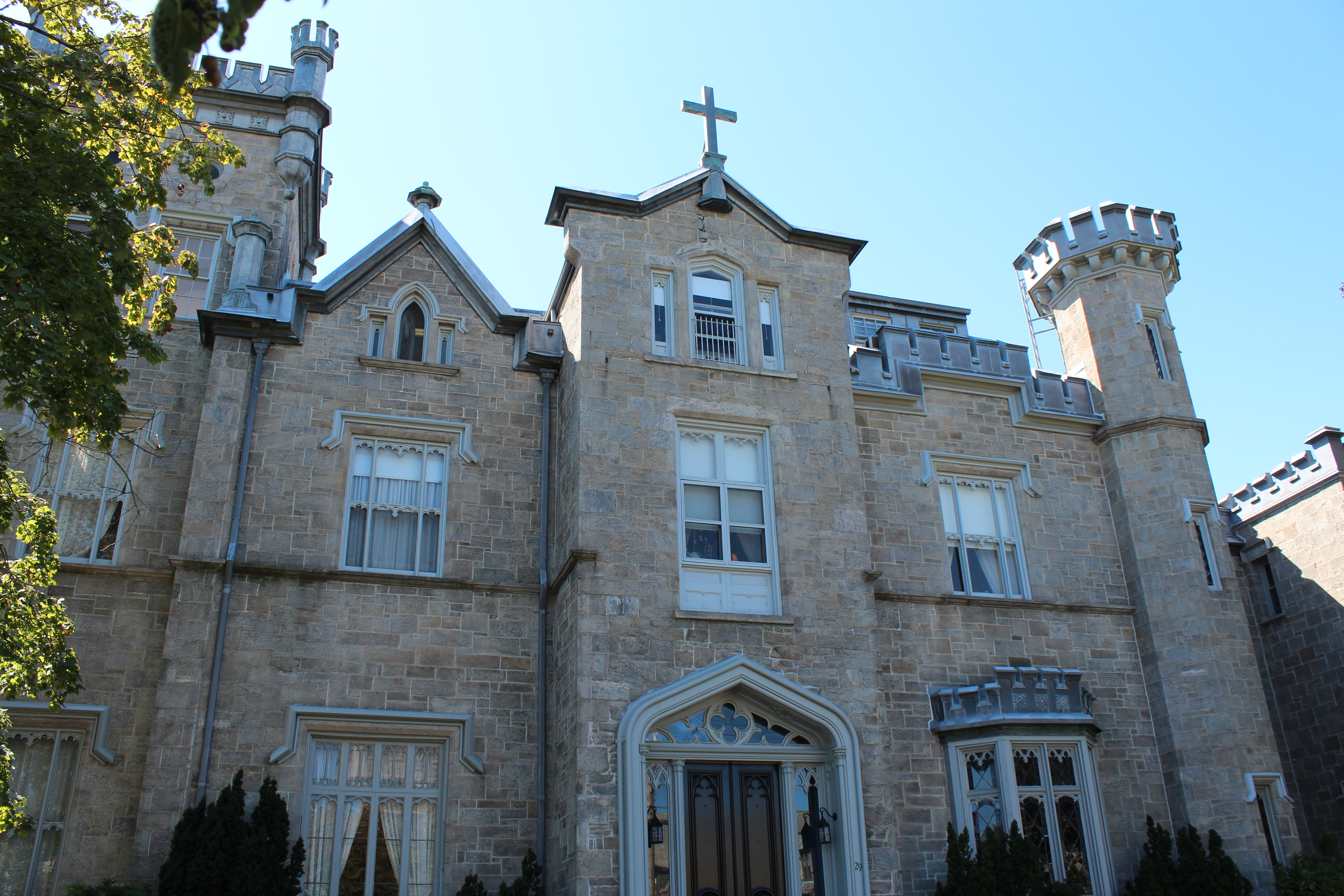
- Leland Castle in 2012

- Location within New York Location within the United States
- Location: 29 Castle Pl., New Rochelle, New York
- Coordinates: 40°53′52″N 73°46′53″W
- Area: 2.62 acres (10,600 m^{2})
- Built: 1855
- Architect: William Thomas Beers
- Architectural style: Gothic Revival
- NRHP reference No.: 76001291
- NYSRHP No.: 11942.000004

Significant dates
- Added to NRHP: August 27, 1976
- Designated NYSRHP: June 23, 1980

Leland Castle (also known as Castle View) is a building in New Rochelle, New York. It was constructed during the years 1855 to 1859 in the Gothic Revival style, and was the country residence of Simeon Leland, a wealthy New York City hotel proprietor. Leland began to assemble an estate as early as 1848, and in 1855, began the erection of this palatial 60-room mansion. The home was designed by New York City architect William Thomas Beers. A north and south wing were added to the castle in 1899 and 1902 respectively.

Leland Castle and the surrounding property have since been incorporated as part of the campus of the College of New Rochelle until its clusre in 2019. The building was added to the National Register of Historic Places in 1976 and the New York State Register in 1980.

== Architecture ==
The main structure is a 2 1/2-story, Gothic Revival home constructed of coarse granite stone. The exterior is enhanced on the southeast corner by a tall square tower, by an hexagonal tower on the northeast, and a round tower on the northwest. The main entrance on the eastern facade is framed by a Gothic pointed arch. Tall, black-walnut doors ornamented with lion's heads are flanked by slender sidelights crowned with Gothic details. All windows are decorated with Gothic tracery and topped with heavily molded labels. As late as 1890, a wooden porte cochere with an open balcony above it stood before the main entrance. Two wooden verandas also opened out from the original building, as did a greenhouse on the south end. All these had disappeared before 1900. The greenhouse was replaced by a veranda, which in turn was replaced in 1897 by a room that followed the outlines of the original greenhouse.

The entrance hall features walnut paneling and a blue and gold Minton tiled floor. The gothic style library contains a bay window with stained- and etched-glass borders, original interior shutters and bookcases, and one of the three original fireplaces in the mansion. Some of the first floor rooms are in the Renaissance style, with round arched doorways. The music room arches are crowned with rococo crests bearing busts of English sovereigns. In the dining room, a Renaissance-style sideboard and mantel, originally designed for this room, contrast with the Gothic diamond-paned windows with etched, amber-colored, stained-glass borders. The sliding doors between the dining and drawing rooms retain their panels of etched glass.

In 1902, a large wing was built onto the north side adjoining the former billiard room and picture gallery extension followed the Gothic style of the original castle. The attic rooms have been subdivided, and a small chapel was installed in a former bedroom on the second floor. In 1926, the wooden parapet of the rear north tower was destroyed by lightning. During the middle part of the 20th century, the wooden gables, turrets, and crenellations over the bay windows were replaced by galvanized iron copies.

In 1974, an interior staircase was installed in the square tower. The castle has three multiflue chimneys, which were originally used to heat the interior. The ornate fixtures of the original gas lighting system remain throughout. A chapel, not original to the building, is attached to the south elevation and a dormitory wing, with a larger chapel which was added in 1902.

== Historical background ==
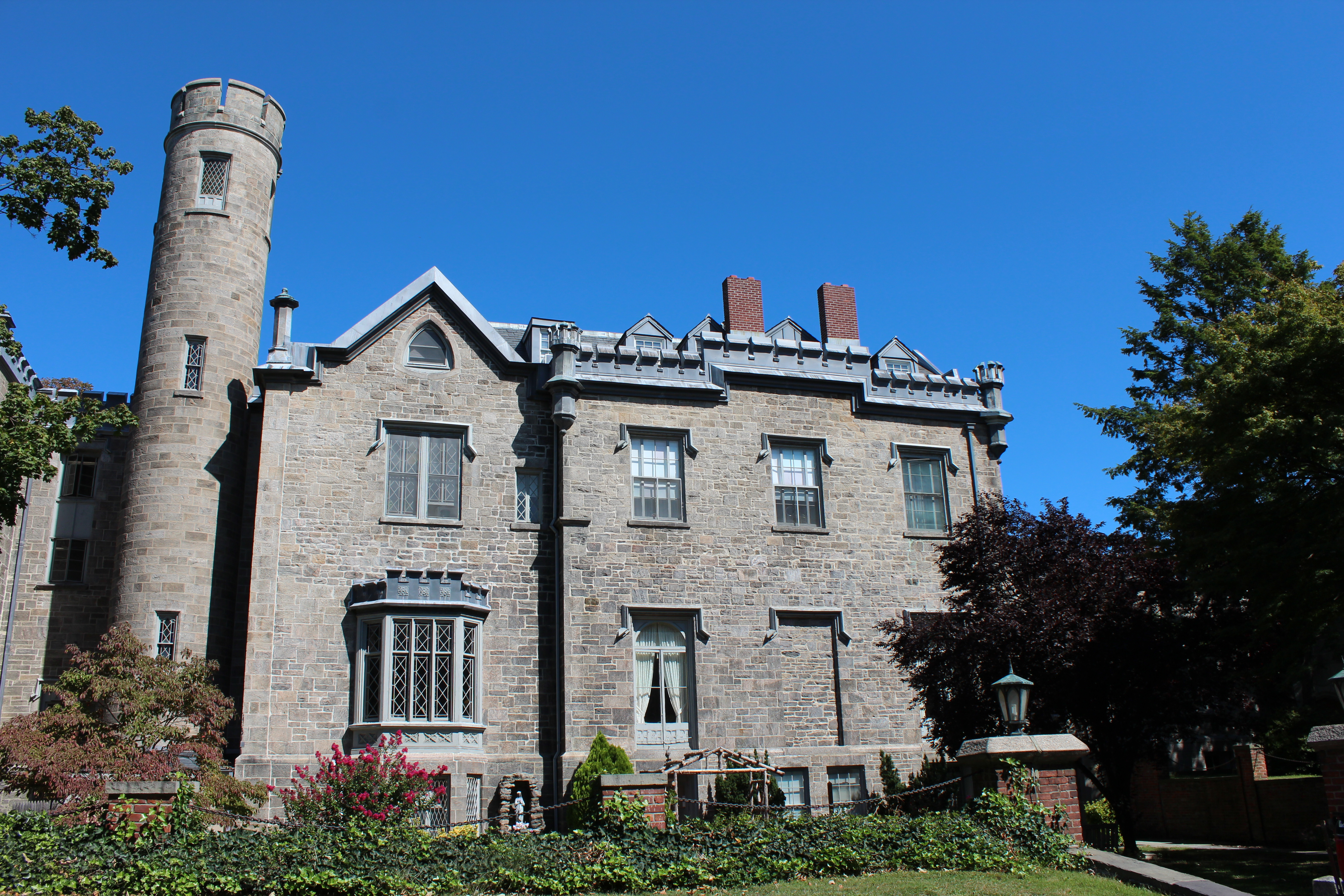
Rear view of castle and courtyard

In 1848, Leland purchased a 40-acre site in New Rochelle overlooking Long Island Sound, on land originally developed by New York businessman Norman White as a summer home in 1838. Like many successful New York businessmen, he took advantage of the railroads' development into the rural areas around New York and carefully planned a suburban enclave designed for graceful and stylish living. Famous for his well-run and fashionable Metropolitan Hotel in New York's theatre district, Leland's home became equally famous as he entertained there regularly. Leland retired in 1872 when his lease on the Metropolitan Hotel expired and was given to William A. "Boss" Tweed. He died later that same year deeply in debt and the mortgage on Castleview was foreclosed. The castle's new owner, the Manhattan Life Insurance Company, allowed Mrs. Leland and her children to continue living there until 1880. The home was then leased by the Queens County Hunt Club for use as an inn, and thus became known as "Castle Inn" for two years.

In 1884, Adrian Iselin, Jr., a member of one of the Hunt Club families from Davenport Neck, purchased the castle and its surrounding acreage for the purpose of developing the land into a residential park. He paved surrounding streets, including Castle Place, put in gas lines and planted many trees, and soon the 40-acre original estate was diminished to just 2½ acres, as Iselin's Residence Park came to occupy much of the former grounds of Leland's estate.

The castle temporarily housed the New Rochelle Collegiate Institute, a boarding school for young boys, from 1889 to 1892, and later to Miss Morse's Academy for young ladies. In 1897, the castle was further damaged by a fire that broke out in the chimney and caused extensive damage to the roof, plaster, and second-floor woodwork. Uninsured, Miss Morse was forced to leave the castle, and with the promise by Iselin of repairs to the smoke and water damage, it was then purchased by Mother Irene Gill for her Ursuline Seminary.

Today, the residence survives in a suburban area more densely settled than the original grand country estate, and serves as a symbol of the fashion, taste, and lifestyle that Americans idealized in the latter part of the 19th century. It is also the only surviving example of the work of William Thomas Beers.

The castle, until 2019, housed the administrative offices of the College of New Rochelle and the college's Castle Art Gallery.

== See also ==
- National Register of Historic Places listings in New Rochelle, New York
- New Rochelle Historic Sites
