= College of New Rochelle =

Catholic college in New Rochelle, New York, US

The College of New Rochelle
- Latin: Collegium Novae Rupellae
- Motto: Wisdom for Life
- Type: Private college
- Active: 1904–2019
- Accreditation: MSCHE
- Affiliations: ACCU; NAICU; CIC
- Religious affiliation: Catholic
- Location: New Rochelle, New York, United States; 40.901664°N 73.781197°W
- Campus: Suburban, 20 acres
- Colors: Blue & White
- Mascot: Blue Angels
- Website: cnr.edu

The College of New Rochelle (CNR) was a private Catholic college with its main campus in New Rochelle, New York. It was founded as the College of St. Angela by Mother Irene Gill, OSU of the Ursuline Order as the first Catholic women's college in New York in 1904. The name was changed to the College of New Rochelle in 1910. The college was composed of four schools and became co-educational in 2016.

In early 2019, Mercy College and College of New Rochelle announced that College of New Rochelle would be absorbed into Mercy College before fall 2019, including College of New Rochelle's students, faculty, programs, and some facilities, as well as transcripts, history, and legacy of CNR alumni. Mercy College became the repository of CNR documents. On September 20, 2019, the college declared Chapter 11 bankruptcy due to $80 million in liabilities.

The entire campus was subsequently sold in an auction and purchased by the Trustees of the Masonic Hall and Asylum Fund, who control certain assets of the Grand Lodge of Free and Accepted Masons of the State of New York including the Utica Masonic Care Community. The site was renamed to the Masonic Care Community of New Rochelle. As of 2025, the site remains largely intact, as the Freemasons ran into permitting issues in redeveloping the site.

== Academics ==
The College of New Rochelle was chartered by the Board of Regents of the University of the State of New York and was accredited by the Middle States Association of Colleges and Secondary Schools. The School of Nursing and Healthcare Professions was accredited by the Commission on Collegiate Nursing Education.

The college offered undergraduate degrees including Bachelor of Arts, Bachelor of Fine Arts, Bachelor of Science, Bachelor of Business Management and Bachelor of Science in nursing. Graduate degrees offered by the college included Master of Arts, Master of Science, and Master of Science in education.

Of the faculty, 89% held doctoral degrees or the highest degree available in their field. The student-faculty ratio was 11:1.

Following a university model, the College of New Rochelle was composed of five separate schools: School of Arts and Sciences; School of Nursing and Healthcare Professions; School of Business; School of New Resources (for adult learners); and Graduate School.

== Campus ==
The main campus was located in New Rochelle, a Westchester County, New York, city about 16 miles (26 km) north of Manhattan. In 1896, the college's founder, Mother Irene Gill, OSU, traveled to New Rochelle to explore the possibility of establishing a seminary there for young women. During this trip, she came across Leland Castle, an 1850s Gothic Revival structure and former vacation home of wealthy New York hotelier Simeon Leland. The castle was purchased in 1897 and became the first structure of the college. It has since been placed on the National Register of Historic Places.

The campus consisted of 20 main buildings, including a $24 million dollar athletic, recreational, and educational complex called the Wellness Center which was completed in 2008. The wellness center featured an NCAA competition-sized swimming pool, basketball court, fitness center, indoor running track, yoga studio, roof garden and meditation garden, and volleyball court. The campus also included the Mooney Center which included an art gallery. There was also the 200,000-volume Mother Irene Gill Memorial Library, the Student Campus Center, the Rogick Life Sciences Building with many laboratories, four residence halls and the Learning Resource Center for Nursing.

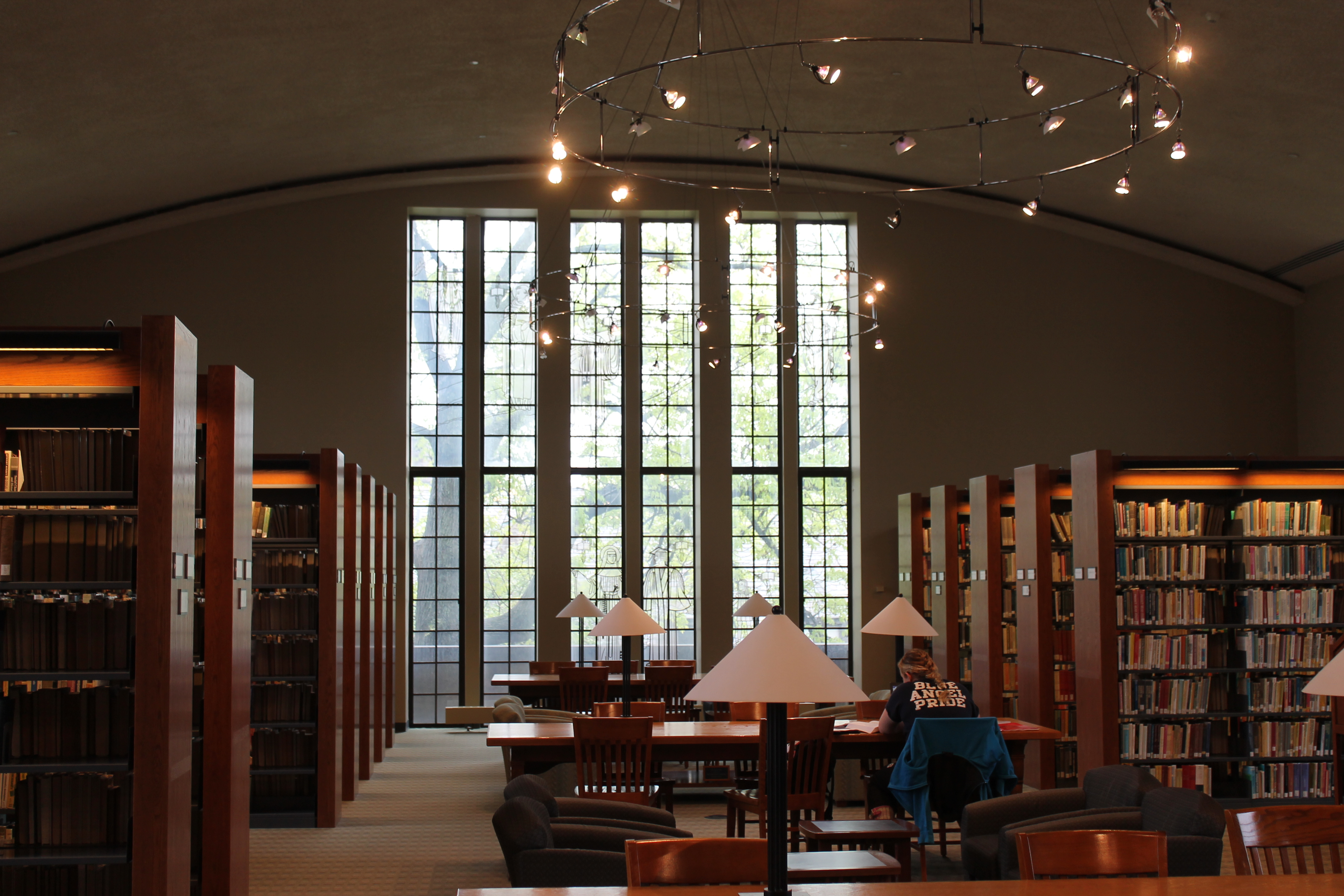
Gill Memorial Library

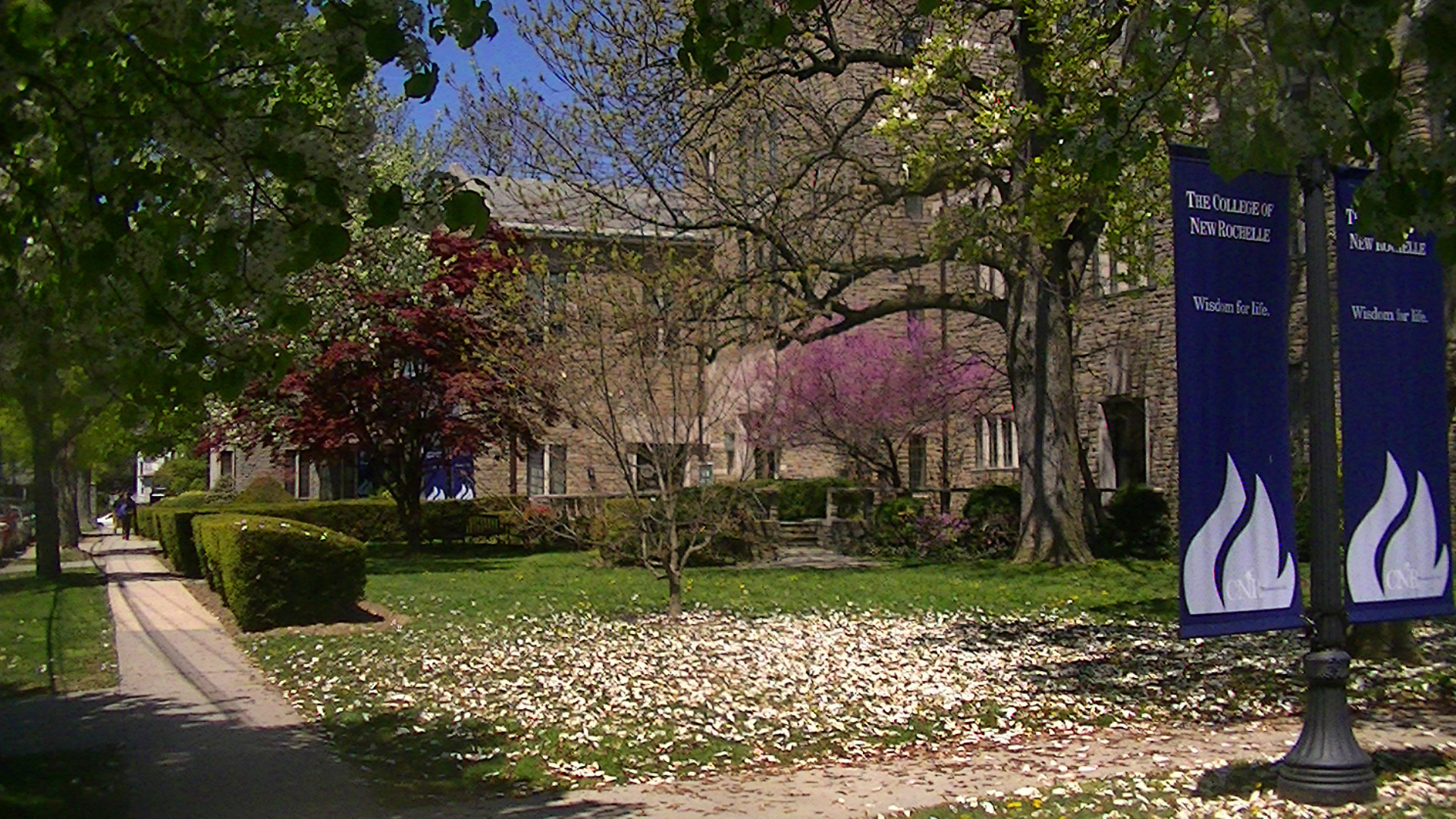
Campus

== Athletics ==
The New Rochelle (CNR) athletic teams were called the Blue Angels. The college was a member of the United States Collegiate Athletic Association (USCAA), primarily competing in the Hudson Valley Intercollegiate Athletic Conference (HVIAC) from 2004–05 to 2018–19.

CNR competed in 12 intercollegiate varsity sports: Men's sports included baseball, basketball, cross country, soccer and swimming; while women's sports included basketball, cross country, soccer, softball, swimming, tennis and volleyball.

== Closure ==
On February 22, 2019, the college announced its intention to close at the end of summer 2019. The college had failed to pay federal payroll taxes and owed the IRS an estimated $20 million. Following that discovery, the college fired faculty and staff, resulting in a lawsuit from dismissed tenured faculty. A New York State judge ruled that the dismissals were improper. On March 28, 2019, the United States Securities and Exchange Commission (SEC) charged Keith Borge, the former controller of the college, with "defrauding municipal securities investors by fraudulently concealing the college's deteriorating finances". The U.S. Attorney's Office also brought criminal charges against Borge, who pleaded guilty and was sentenced to three years in prison. He was released in 2022. The SEC did not file charges against the college because it cooperated with the investigation.

Mercy College became the repository of CNR documents. On August 12, 2019, William Latimer, the 14th and final College of New Rochelle president, joined Mercy College as vice president of its New Rochelle and Bronx locations serving in that role until March 2022.

In September 2019, the college declared bankruptcy as it had $80 million in liabilities. The campus and related materials were sold at auction and purchased by The Lodge Society Temple of New Rochelle, an organization affiliated with the Grand Lodge of Free and Accepted Masons of the State of New York, for $32 million in a private real estate bankruptcy auction case.

== Notable alumni ==
The College of New Rochelle's alumni were integrated into Mercy University's alumni community in 2019.

- Madeleine Blais, Pulitzer Prize–winning journalist and author
- Patricia Breslin, Attended from 1943-1947. American actress and philanthropist.
- Mary Donohue, retired Judge of the New York Court of Claims and a former two-term Lieutenant Governor of New York.
- Paule Valery Joseph, American nurse and Fellow of the National Academy of Medicine
- Dorothy Kilgallen, American journalist and What's My Line panelist.
- Regina Peruggi, American educator who was President of Kingsborough Community College from 2005 to 2014, first wife of Rudy Giuliani
- Mercedes Ruehl, Academy and Tony Award–winning American screen and stage actor.
- Terry O'Malley Seidler, American former baseball executive and owner of the Los Angeles Dodgers.
- Margaret C. Snyder, American social scientist and founding director of the United Nations Development Fund for Women
- Franca Somigli, soprano
- Anne Sweeney, American businesswoman, co-chair of Disney Media Networks and president of the Disney-ABC Television Group
- Patricia Ann Tracey, retired United States naval officer, first woman promoted to the rank of vice admiral in the USN.

== See also ==
- List of defunct colleges and universities in New York
- Leland Castle
- Mother Irene Gill Memorial Library
