= List of places named after places in the United States =

The list of places named after places in the United States identifies namesake places and the eponymic United States place for which they are named.

Places named for United States places
Namesake	Area	Country	Eponym	Area	Source
Abilene	Texas	United States	Abilene	Kansas	
Acton	Maine	United States	Acton	Massachusetts	
Akron	New York	United States	Akron	Ohio	
Albany	California	United States	Albany	New York	
Albany	Missouri	United States	Albany	New York	
Albany	Oregon	United States	Albany	New York	
Albany	Texas	United States	Albany	Georgia	
Alton	California	United States	Alton	Illinois	
Amherst	Maine	United States	Amherst	New Hampshire	
Arguta	Alabama	United States	Argura	North Carolina	
Arlington	Texas	United States	Arlington	Virginia	(Note: Technically Arlington, Texas is named not for Arlington County, Virginia, but for Arlington House, Robert E. Lee's mansion, which is also Arlington County, Virginia's namesake.)
Arlington County	Virginia	United States	Arlington Archeological Site	Virginia	(Note: Via Arlington House)
Ashland	Kansas	United States	Ashland	Kentucky	
Ashland	Massachusetts	United States	Ashland	Kentucky	
Ashland	Mississippi	United States	Ashland	Kentucky	
Ashland	Nebraska	United States	Ashland	Kentucky	
Ashland	New York	United States	Ashland	Kentucky	
Ashland	Pennsylvania	United States	Ashland	Kentucky	
Ashland	Ohio	United States	Ashland	Kentucky	
Ashland	Oregon	United States	Ashland	Kentucky	
Ashland	Wisconsin	United States	Ashland	Kentucky	
Barre	New York	United States	Barre	Massachusetts	
Barre	Vermont	United States	Barre	Massachusetts	
Barre	Wisconsin	United States	Barre	Vermont	
Bath	New Brunswick	Canada	Bath	Maine	(Note: Possibly also for Bath, England)
Beloit	Kansas	United States	Beloit	Wisconsin	
Beloit	Wisconsin	United States	Detroit	Michigan	
Berwick	Nova Scotia	Canada	Berwick	Maine	
Boston	Indiana	United States	Boston	Massachusetts	
Boston	Missouri	United States	Boston	Massachusetts	
Boston	New York	United States	Boston	Massachusetts	
Boston	Ohio	United States	Boston	Massachusetts	
Boston	Ohio	United States	Boston Township	Massachusetts	
Boston Corner	New York	United States	Boston	Massachusetts	
Boston Township	Ohio	United States	Boston	Massachusetts	
South Boston	Virginia	United States	Boston	Massachusetts	
Bowling Green	Kentucky	United States	Bowling Green	Virginia	
Bowling Green	Ohio	United States	Bowling Green	Kentucky	
Bradford	New Hampshire	United States	Bradford	Massachusetts	
Bradford	Vermont	United States	Bradford	Massachusetts	
Braintree	Vermont	United States	Braintree	Massachusetts	
Bridgetown	Ohio	United States	Bridgeton	New Jersey	
Bristol	Ohio	United States	Bristol	Connecticut	
Bristolville	Ohio	United States	Bristol	Connecticut	
Brimfield	Ohio	United States	Brimfield	Massachusetts	
Brookhaven	Mississippi	United States	Brookhaven	New York	
Brooklyn	Michigan	United States	Brooklyn	New York	
Brooklyn	Mississippi	United States	Brooklyn	New York	
Bunker Hill	Illinois	United States	Bunker Hill	Massachusetts	(Note: Named for the Battle of Bunker Hill)
Burlington	Kansas	United States	Burlington	Vermont	
Burlington	Iowa	United States	Burlington	Vermont	
Burlington	Michigan	United States	Burlington	Vermont	
California	Pennsylvania	United States	California (U.S. state)	Western United States	
Cambridge	Nova Scotia	Canada	Cambridge	Massachusetts	
Camden County	Missouri	United States	Camden County	North Carolina	
Carrollton	Arkansas	United States	Carrollton	Maryland	
Carrollton	Georgia	United States	Carrollton	Maryland	
Carrollton	Iowa	United States	Carrollton	Maryland	
Carrollton	Kentucky	United States	Carrollton	Maryland	
Carrollton	Mississippi	United States	Carrollton	Maryland	
Carrollton	Missouri	United States	Carrollton	Maryland	
Carrollton	Texas	United States	Carrollton	Illinois	
Cazenovia	Illinois	United States	Cazenovia	New York	
Cazenovia	Minnesota	United States	Cazenovia	New York	
Cazenovia	Wisconsin	United States	Cazenovia	New York	
Charleston	Mississippi	United States	Charleston	South Carolina	
Chelsea	Quebec	Canada	Chelsea	Vermont	
Chester	Mississippi	United States	Chester	South Carolina	
Chester	Nova Scotia	Canada	Chester	Pennsylvania	
Cleveland	Gauteng	South Africa	Cleveland	Ohio	
Cohassett	Alabama	United States	Cohasset	Massachusetts	
Colchester	New York	United States	Colchester	Connecticut	
Coldwater	Kansas	United States	Coldwater	Michigan	
Colwich	Kansas	United States	Colorado (U.S. state); Wichita	Western United States; Kansas	
Concord	North Carolina	United States	Concord	Massachusetts	(Note: Named for the Battle of Concord)
Concord	Vermont	United States	Concord	Massachusetts	
Concord Township	Ohio	United States	Concord	Massachusetts	
Conestogo River	Ontario	Canada	Conestoga River	Pennsylvania	
Cortland	Kansas	United States	Cortland	New York	
Coventry	Vermont	United States	Coventry	Connecticut	
Creston	British Columbia	Canada	Creston	Iowa	
Croton	Michigan	United States	Croton	New York	
Danville	Quebec	Canada	Danville	Vermont	
Des Moines	Washington	United States	Des Moines	Iowa	
Elgin	Alabama	United States	Elgin	Illinois	
Elk Point	Alberta	Canada	Elk Point	South Dakota	
Elmira	Ontario	Canada	Elmira	New York	
Florida	Massachusetts	United States	Spanish Florida	Southern United States	
Forestburg	Alberta	Canada	Forestburg	South Dakota	
Hampstead	New Brunswick	Canada	Hampstead	New York	
Hampton	New Brunswick	Canada	Hampton	New York	
Hartford	Kansas	United States	Hartford	Connecticut	
Hartford Township	Ohio	United States	Hartford	Connecticut	
Hartford	Vermont	United States	Hartford	Connecticut	
Hartford	West Virginia	United States	Hartford	Connecticut	
Harvard	Illinois	United States	Harvard University	Massachusetts	
Huntsville	Texas	Republic of Texas (Note: Was founded in the Republic of Texas, Now located in the United States)	Huntsville	Alabama	
Kansas City	Kansas	United States	Kansas City	Missouri	
Knoxville	Mississippi	United States	Knoxville	Tennessee	
Kokomo	Mississippi	United States	Kokomo	Indiana	
Lamoille	Nevada	United States	Lamoille County	Vermont	
Lancaster	New Brunswick	Canada	Lancaster	Massachusetts	
Lincoln	New Brunswick	Canada	Lincoln	Massachusetts	(Note: Possibly for Lincoln, England)
Lexington	Kentucky	United States	Lexington	Massachusetts	
Londonderry	Nova Scotia	Canada	Londondery	New Hampshire	
Manhattan	Kansas	United States	Manhattan	New York City	
Manhattan	Montana	United States	Manhattan	New York City	
Mankota	Saskatchewan	Canada	Mankato	Minnesota	
Maryland	London	United Kingdom	Maryland	Mid-Atlantic states	
Maryland County	Southeastern Liberia	Liberia	Maryland	Mid-Atlantic states	
Mount Harvard	Colorado	United States	Harvard University	Massachusetts	
Mount Seattle	Yukon	Canada	Seattle	Washington (state)	
Mount Yale	Colorado	United States	Yale University	Connecticut	
New Albany	Ohio	United States	Albany	New York	
Newburgh	Ontario	Canada	Newburgh	New York	
Newbury	Ohio	United States	Newburyport	Massachusetts	
New Albion	New York	United States	Albion	New York	
New Denver	British Columbia	Canada	Denver	Colorado	
New Hampshire	Ohio	United States	New Hampshire	New England	
New Philadelphia	Ohio	United States	Philadelphia	Pennsylvania	
North Royalton	Ohio	United States	Royalton Township (defunct)	Vermont	
Northfield	Ohio	United States	Northfield	Massachusetts	
Norton	New Brunswick	Canada	Norton	Massachusetts	
Norwalk	Ohio	United States	Norwalk	Connecticut	
Norwich	Vermont	United States	Norwich	Connecticut	
Olathe	Colorado	United States	Olathe	Kansas	
Orono	Ontario	Canada	Orono	Maine	
Oswego	Mississippi	United States	Oswego	New York	
Paducah	Texas	United States	Paducah	Kentucky	
Philadelphia Boulevard	Torún	Poland	Philadelphia	Pennsylvania	
Port Royal	Mississippi	United States	Port Royal	South Carolina	
Royalton Township (defunct)	Vermont	United States	Royalton, Vermont	Vermont	
Saratoga Springs	California	United States	Saratoga Springs	New York	
Saugus	California	United States	Saugus	Massachusetts	
Saybrook	Illinois	United States	Old Saybrook	Connecticut	(Note: "Influenced" by Saybrook, Ohio)
Saybrook	Illinois	United States	Saybrook	Ohio	(Note: "Influenced" by Saybrook, Ohio)
Saybrook	Ohio	United States	Old Saybrook	Connecticut	
Sturgis	Saskatchewan	Canada	Sturgis	South Dakota	
Texas	Queensland	Australia	Texas	Southern United States	
Thedford	Ontario	Canada	Thetford	Vermont	
Toledo	Oregon	United States	Toledo	Ohio	
Troy	Michigan	United States	Troy	New York	
Unity	Saskatchewan	Canada	Unity	Wisconsin	
Virginia	Free State	South Africa	Virginia	Mid-Atlantic states	
Wadena	Saskatchewan	Canada	Wadena	Minnesota	
Westchester	Nova Scotia	Canada	Westchester County	New York	
Weymouth	Nova Scotia	Canada	Weymouth	Massachusetts	
Woonsocket	South Dakota	United States	Woonsocket	Rhode Island	
Worthington	Minnesota	United States	Worthington	Ohio	
Wyoming (U.S. state)	Western United States	United States	Wyoming Valley	Pennsylvania	
Wyoming	Delaware	United States	Wyoming Valley	Pennsylvania	
Wyoming	Michigan	United States	Wyoming Valley	Pennsylvania	
Wyoming County	New York	United States	Wyoming Valley	Pennsylvania	
Wyoming	Ohio	United States	Wyoming	Pennsylvania	
Wyoming	Ontario	Canada	Wyoming Valley	Pennsylvania	
Wyoming County	West Virginia	United States	Wyoming Valley	Pennsylvania	
Yale	Michigan	United States	Yale University	Connecticut	
Yarmouth	Nova Scotia	Canada	Yarmouth	Massachusetts	
