= United Empire Loyalist =

Title given to loyalists during the American Revolution who resettled in colonial Canada

United Empire Loyalists
- The United Empire Loyalist flag, which is similar to but wider than the flag of Great Britain
- Abbreviation: UEL
- Formation: 9 November 1789; 237 years ago (Note: The following date was when the honorific was created.)
- Purpose: Honorific title
- Origins: Loyalists
- Region served: British Empire, Canada

United Empire Loyalist (UEL, or simply Loyalist) is an honorific title which was first given by the 1st Lord Dorchester, the governor of Quebec and governor general of the Canadas, to American Loyalists who resettled in British North America during or after the American Revolution. At that time, the demonym Canadian or Canadien was used by the descendants of New France settlers inhabiting the Province of Quebec.

They settled primarily in Nova Scotia and the province of Quebec. The influx of loyalist settlers resulted in the creation of several new colonies. In 1784, New Brunswick was partitioned from the Colony of Nova Scotia after significant loyalist resettlement around the Bay of Fundy. The influx of loyalist refugees also resulted in the province of Quebec's division into Lower Canada (present-day Quebec), and Upper Canada (present-day Ontario) in 1791. The Crown gave them land grants of one lot. One lot consisted of 200 acres (81 ha) per person to encourage their resettlement, as the Government wanted to develop the frontier of Upper Canada. This resettlement added many English speakers to the Canadian population. It was the beginning of new waves of immigration that established a predominantly Anglo-Canadian population in the future Canada both west and east of the modern Quebec border.

== History ==
=== American Revolution ===
Loyalist refugees on their way to the Canadas during the American Revolution.

Following the end of the American Revolutionary War and the signing of the Treaty of Paris in 1783, both Loyalist soldiers and civilians were evacuated from New York City, most heading for Canada. Many Loyalists had already migrated to Canada, especially from New York and northern New England, where violence against them had increased during the war.

The Crown-allotted land in Canada was sometimes allotted according to which Loyalist regiment a man had fought in. This Loyalist resettlement was critical to the development of present-day Ontario, and some 10,000 refugees went to Quebec (including the Eastern Townships and modern-day Ontario). But Nova Scotia (including modern-day New Brunswick) received three times that number: about 35,000–40,000 Loyalist refugees.

Many of these loyalist immigrants did not stay in Canada; they eventually returned to the United States. Some families were split in their loyalties during the war years. Many Loyalists in Canada maintained ties with relatives in the United States. They conducted commerce across the border with little regard to British trade laws. In the 1790s, Lieutenant-Governor Simcoe's offer of land and low taxes, which were one-quarter the level of those in the U.S., in exchange for allegiance resulted in the arrival of 30,000 Americans, often referred to as Late Loyalists. By the outbreak of the War of 1812, the 110,000 inhabitants of Upper Canada, consisted of 20,000 initial Loyalists, 60,000 later U.S. immigrants and their descendants, and the rest being immigrants from the UK (including Ireland) and their descendants and immigrants from the Old Province of Quebec. Likely the main reason for the movement of Quebec residents to Upper Canada was land.

=== Resettlement ===
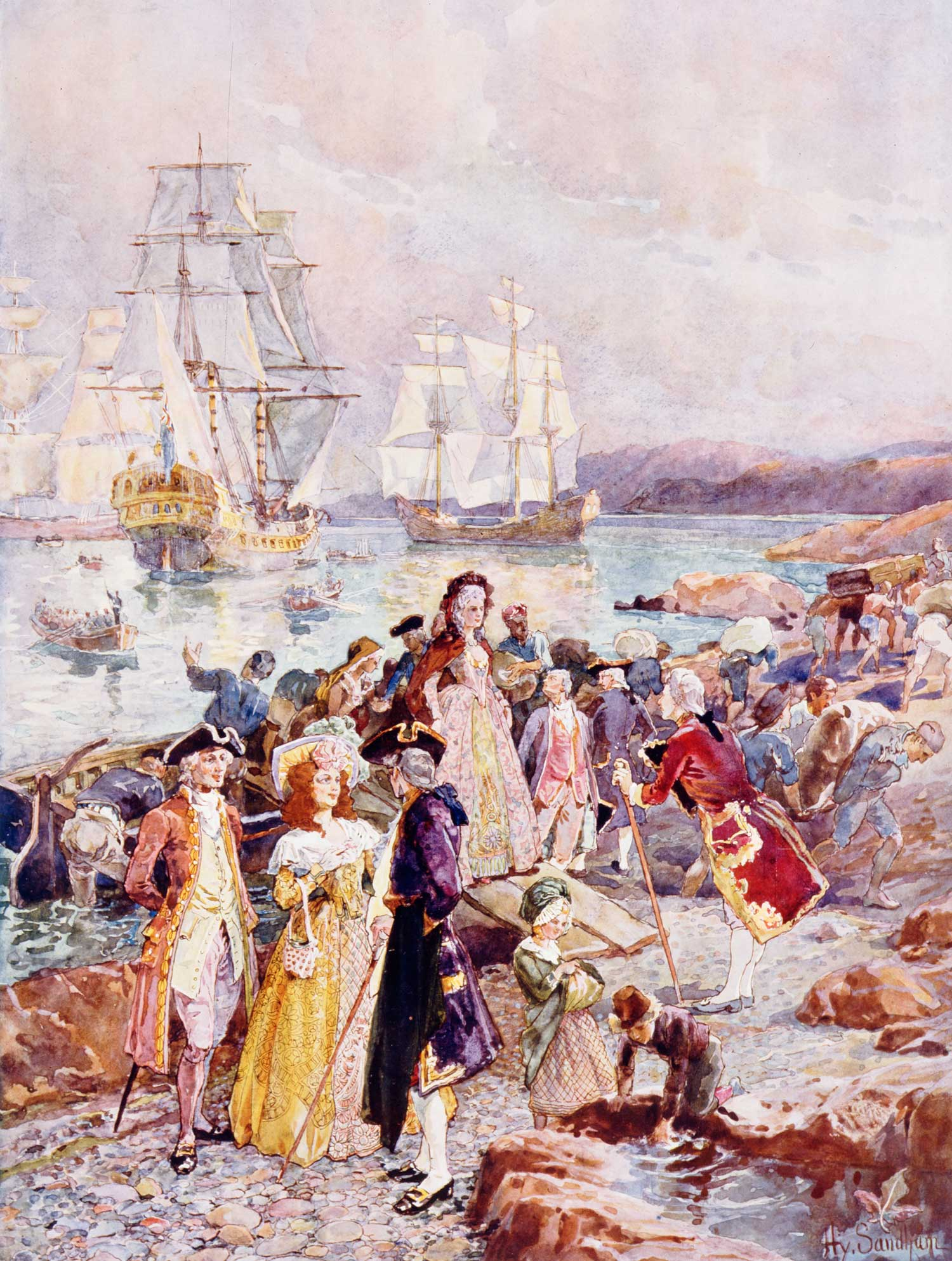
The Coming of the Loyalists by Henry Sandham, showing a romanticised view of the Loyalists' arrival in New Brunswick.

The arrival of the Loyalists after the Revolutionary War led to the division of Canada into the provinces of Upper Canada (what is now southern Ontario) and Lower Canada (today's southern Quebec). They arrived and were largely settled in groups by ethnicity and religion. Many soldiers settled with others of the regiments they had served with. The settlers came from every social class and all thirteen colonies, unlike the depiction of them in the Sandham painting which suggests the arrivals were well-dressed upper-class immigrants.

Loyalists soon petitioned the government to be allowed to use the British legal system, which they were accustomed to in the American colonies, rather than the French system. Great Britain had maintained the French legal system and allowed freedom of religion after taking over the former French colony with the defeat of France in the Seven Years' War. With the creation of Upper and Lower Canada, most Loyalists in the west could live under British laws and institutions. The predominantly ethnic French population of Lower Canada, who were still French-speaking, could maintain their familiar French civil law and Catholic religion.

Realizing the importance of some type of recognition, on 9 November 1789, Lord Dorchester, the governor of Quebec and Governor General of British North America, declared "that it was his Wish to put the mark of Honour upon the Families who had adhered to the Unity of the Empire". As a result of Dorchester's statement, the printed militia rolls carried the notation:

Those Loyalists who have adhered to the Unity of the Empire, and joined the Royal Standard before the Treaty of Separation in the year 1783, and all their Children and their Descendants by either sex, are to be distinguished by the following Capitals, affixed to their names: UE or U.E. Alluding to their great principle The Unity of the Empire.

Because most of the nations of the Haudenosaunee had allied with the British, which had ceded their lands to the United States, thousands of Haudenosaunee and other pro-British Native Americans were expelled from New York and other states. They were also resettled in Canada. Many of the Haudenosaunee, led by Joseph Brant Thayendenegea, settled at Six Nations of the Grand River, the largest First Nations reserve in Canada. A smaller group of Haudenosaunee led by Captain John Deserontyon Odeserundiye, settled on the shores of the Bay of Quinte in modern-day southeastern Ontario.

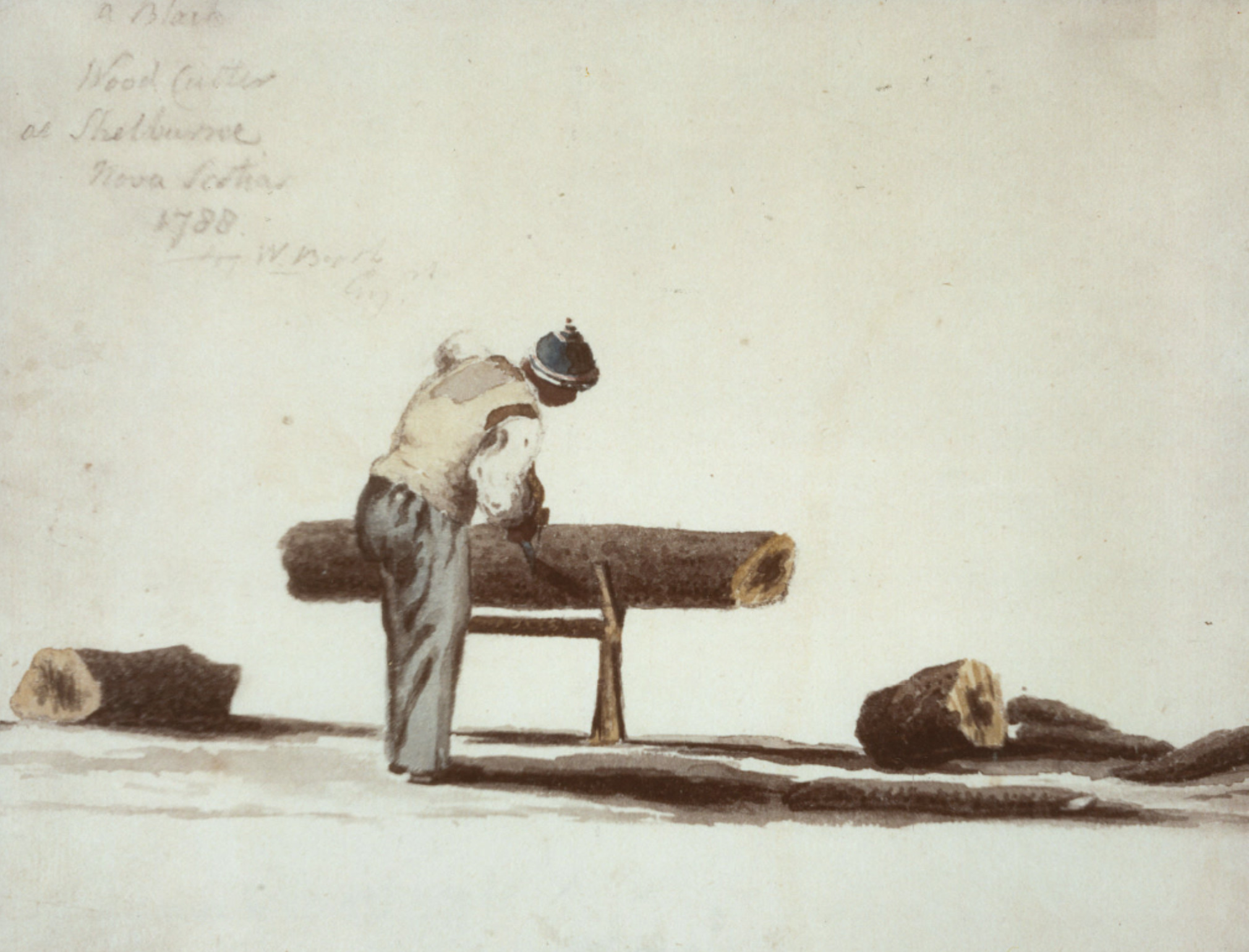
1788 illustration of a Black woodcutter in Shelburne, Nova Scotia

The government settled some 3,500 Black Loyalists in Nova Scotia and New Brunswick, but they faced discrimination and the same inadequate support that all Loyalists experienced. Delays in making land grants, but mostly the fact that blacks were paid less than whites, and so held jobs whites might have worked, aggravated racist tensions in Shelburne. Mobs of white Loyalists attacked Black Loyalists in the Shelburne Riots in July 1784, Canada's first so-called "race" riot. The government was slow to survey the land of Black Loyalists (which meant they could not settle); it was also discriminatory in granting them smaller, poorer, and more remote lands than those of white settlers; not counting those Loyalists who were resettled in what would become Upper Canada, in general, or around the Bay of Quinte, in specific. This increased their difficulties in becoming established. The majority of Black Loyalists in Canada were refugees from the American South; they suffered from this discrimination and the harsh winters.

When Great Britain set up the colony of Sierra Leone in Africa, nearly 1,300 Black Loyalists emigrated there in 1792 for the promise of self-government. And so 2,200 remained. The Black Loyalists that left established Freetown in Sierra Leone. Well into the 20th century, together with other early settlers from Jamaica and slaves liberated from illegal slave ships, and despite vicious attacks from the indigenous peoples that nearly ended the Maroon colony, they and their descendants dominated the culture, economy and government of Sierra Leone.

Numerous Loyalists had been forced to abandon substantial amounts of property in the United States. Britain sought restoration or compensation for this lost property from the United States, which was a major issue during the negotiation of the Jay Treaty in 1795. Negotiations settled on the concept of the United States negotiators "advising" the U.S. Congress to provide restitution. For the British, this concept carried significant legal weight, far more than it did to the Americans; the U.S. Congress declined to accept the advice.

==== Slavery ====
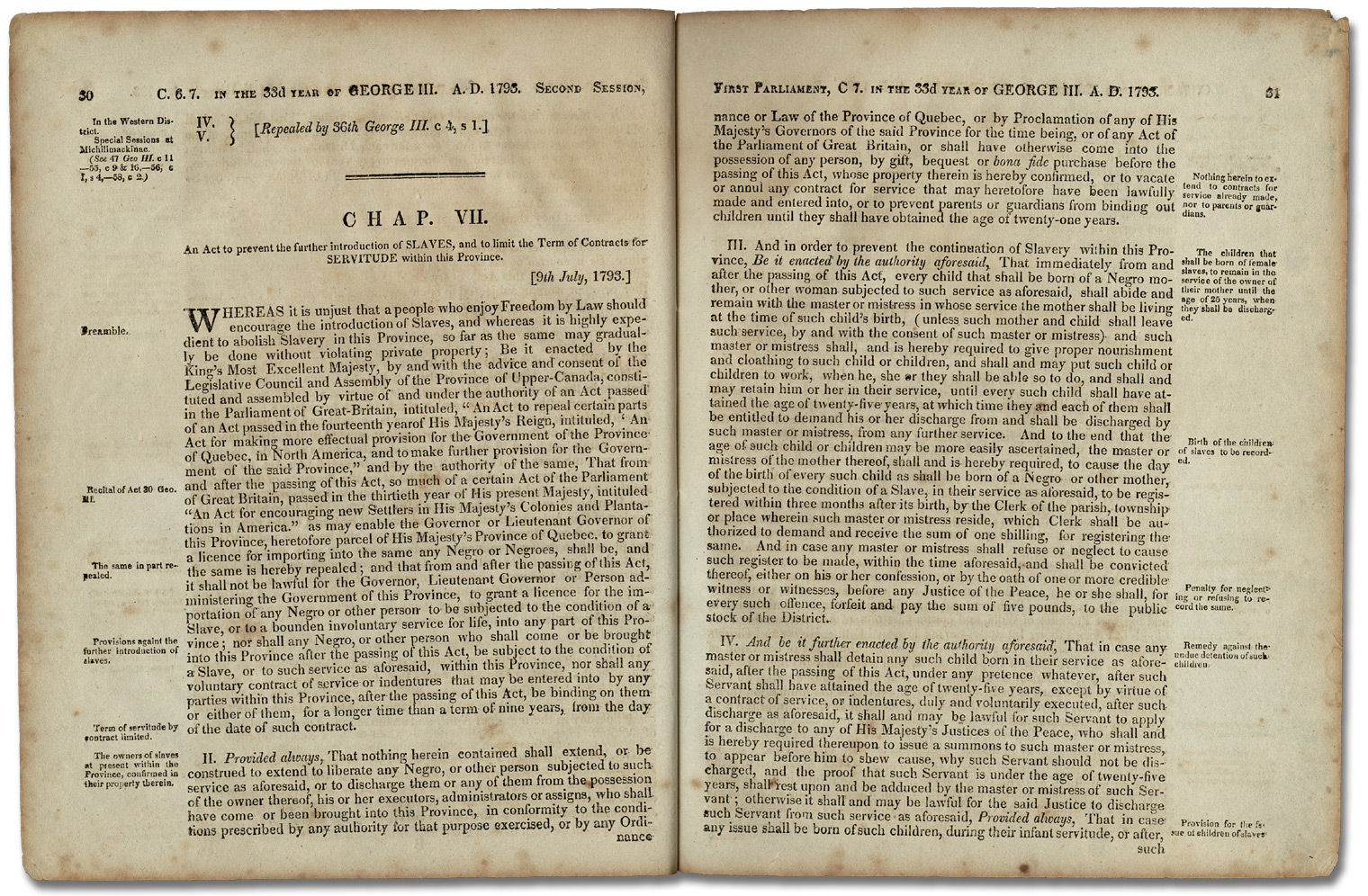
The Act Against Slavery, 1793, an anti-slavery act passed in Upper Canada. The act was created partially in response to Loyalist refugees who brought slaves with them.

Slave-owning Loyalists from across the former Thirteen Colonies brought their slaves with them to Canada, as the practice was still legal there. They took a total of about 2,000 slaves to British North America: 500 in Upper Canada (Ontario), 300 in Lower Canada (Quebec), and 1,200 in the Maritime colonies of New Brunswick, Nova Scotia, and Prince Edward Island. The presence and condition of slaves in the Maritimes would become a particular issue. They constituted a larger portion of the population, but it was not an area of plantation agriculture.

The settlers eventually freed many of these slaves. Together with the free Black Loyalists, many chose to go to Sierra Leone in 1792 and following years, seeking a chance for self-government. Meanwhile, the British Parliament passed the Settlers in American Colonies Act 1790 (30 Geo. 3. c. 27) that assured prospective immigrants to Canada that they could retain their slaves as property. In 1793, an anti-slavery law was passed, in the 1st Parliament of Upper Canada. The Act Against Slavery banned the importation of slaves into the colony, and mandated the emancipation of all children born henceforth to female slaves upon reaching the age of 25. The Act was partially introduced due to the influx of the number of slaves brought by Loyalist refugees to Upper Canada. The slave trade was abolished across the British Empire in 1807. The institution of slavery was abolished Empire-wide by 1834 (except in India, where it was considered an indigenous institution).

=== War of 1812 ===
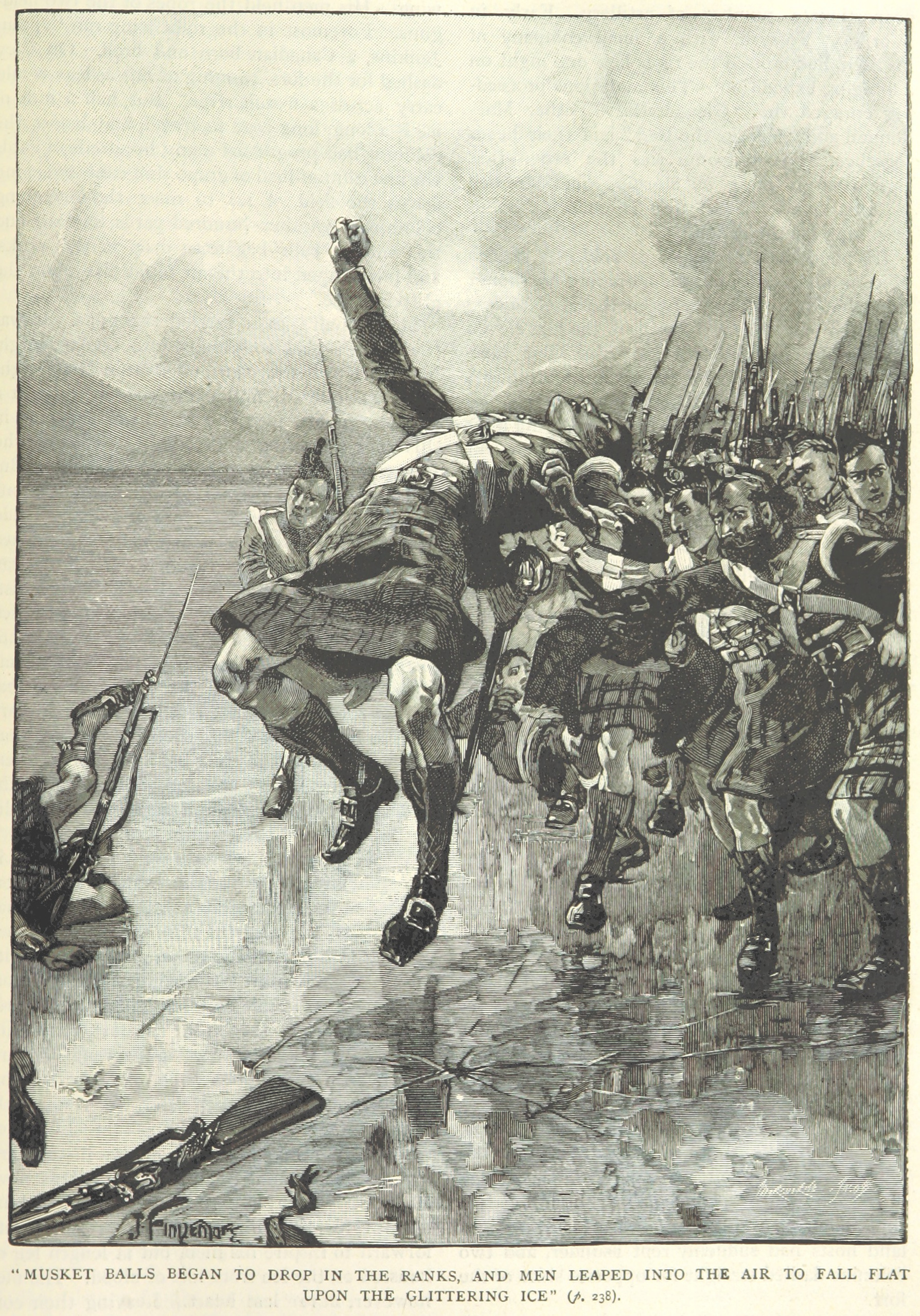
Depiction of Glengarry Light Infantry's charge across a frozen river during the Battle of Ogdensburg. The unit's membership was restricted to Loyalist and British settlers.

From 1812 to 1815, the United States and the United Kingdom were engaged in a conflict known as the War of 1812. On 18 June 1812, US President James Madison signed the declaration of war into law, after receiving heavy pressure from the War Hawks in Congress.

By 1812, Upper Canada had been settled mostly by Revolution-era Loyalists from the United States (United Empire Loyalists) and postwar American and British immigrants. The Canadas were thinly populated and only lightly defended by the British Army and the sedentary units of the Canadian Militia. American leaders assumed that Canada could be easily overrun, with former president Thomas Jefferson optimistically describing the potential conquest of Canada as "a matter of marching". Many Loyalist Americans had migrated to Upper Canada after the Revolutionary War. However, there was also a significant number of non-Loyalist American settlers in the area due to the offer of land grants to immigrants. The Americans assumed the latter population would favour the American cause, but they did not. Although the population of Upper Canada included recent settlers from the United States who had no obvious loyalties to the Crown, the American forces found strong opposition from settlers during the War of 1812.

A number of loyalists served as fencibles, provincial regulars, in the Provincial Marine, or with the sedentary militia. With the successful defense of the Canadian colonies from American invasion, Loyalists saw the War of 1812 as a victory. After the war, the British government transported to New Brunswick and settled about 400 of 3,000 former slaves from the United States whom they freed during and after the war. It had fulfilled its promise to them of freedom if they left Patriot slaveholders and fought with the British. Enslaved African Americans risked considerable danger by crossing to British lines to achieve freedom.

=== Present ===
While the honorific "United Empire Loyalist" is not part of the official Canadian honours system, modern-day descendants of Loyalist refugees may employ it, sometimes using "U.E." as postnominal letters. The practice, however, is uncommon today, even in original Loyalist strongholds like southeastern Ontario. Historians and genealogists use it extensively as a shorthand for identifying the ancestry of particular families.

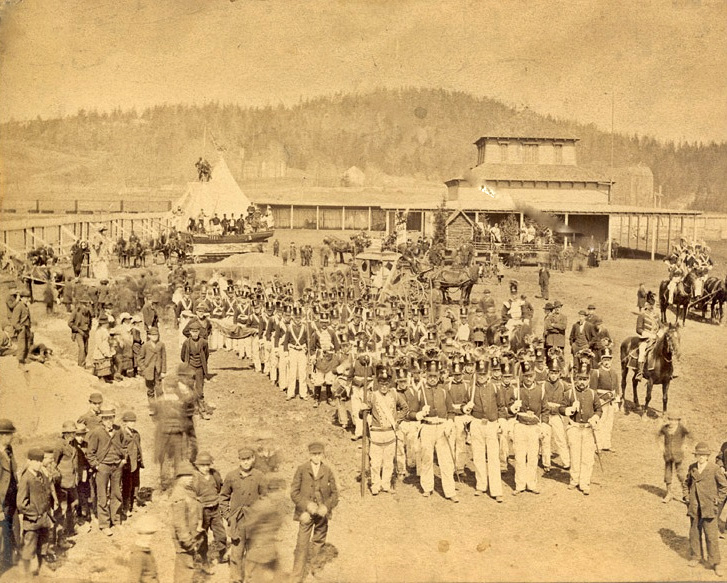
Gathering for the Loyalist Centennial Parade in Saint John, New Brunswick, in 1883.

The influence of the Loyalists on the evolution of Canada remains evident. Their ties with Britain and antipathy to the United States provided the strength needed to keep Canada independent and distinct in North America. The Loyalists' basic distrust of republicanism and "mob rule" influenced Canada's gradual, "paper-strewn" path to independence. The new British North American provinces of Upper Canada (the forerunner of Ontario) and New Brunswick were created as places of refuge for the United Empire Loyalists. The mottoes of the two provinces reflect this history: Ontario's, also found on its coat of arms, is Ut incepit fidelis sic permanet ("Loyal she began, loyal she remains"); New Brunswick's, Spem Reduxit ("Hope restored").

The word "Loyalist" appears frequently in school, street, and business names in such Loyalist-settled communities as Belleville, Ontario. The nearby city of Kingston, established as a Loyalist stronghold, was named in honour of King George III. And on the outskirts of that city is a township simply named "Loyalist".

Canada's 2021 Census estimates a population of 10,015 who identify as having United Empire Loyalist origins, based on a 25% sample.

Some historians estimate that there are at least four to six million Canadians living today (about one in five) who are descended from a Loyalist ancestor.

On 1 July 1934, Royal Mail Canada issued "United Empire Loyalists, 1776–1784" designed by Robert Bruce McCracken based on Sydney March's sculpture United Empire Loyalists.

In 1996, Canadian politicians Peter Milliken (a descendant of American Loyalists) and John Godfrey sponsored the Godfrey–Milliken Bill, which would have entitled Loyalist descendants to reclaim ancestral property in the United States which had been confiscated during the American Revolution. The bill, which did not pass the House of Commons, was intended primarily as a satirical response to the contemporaneous American Helms–Burton Act.

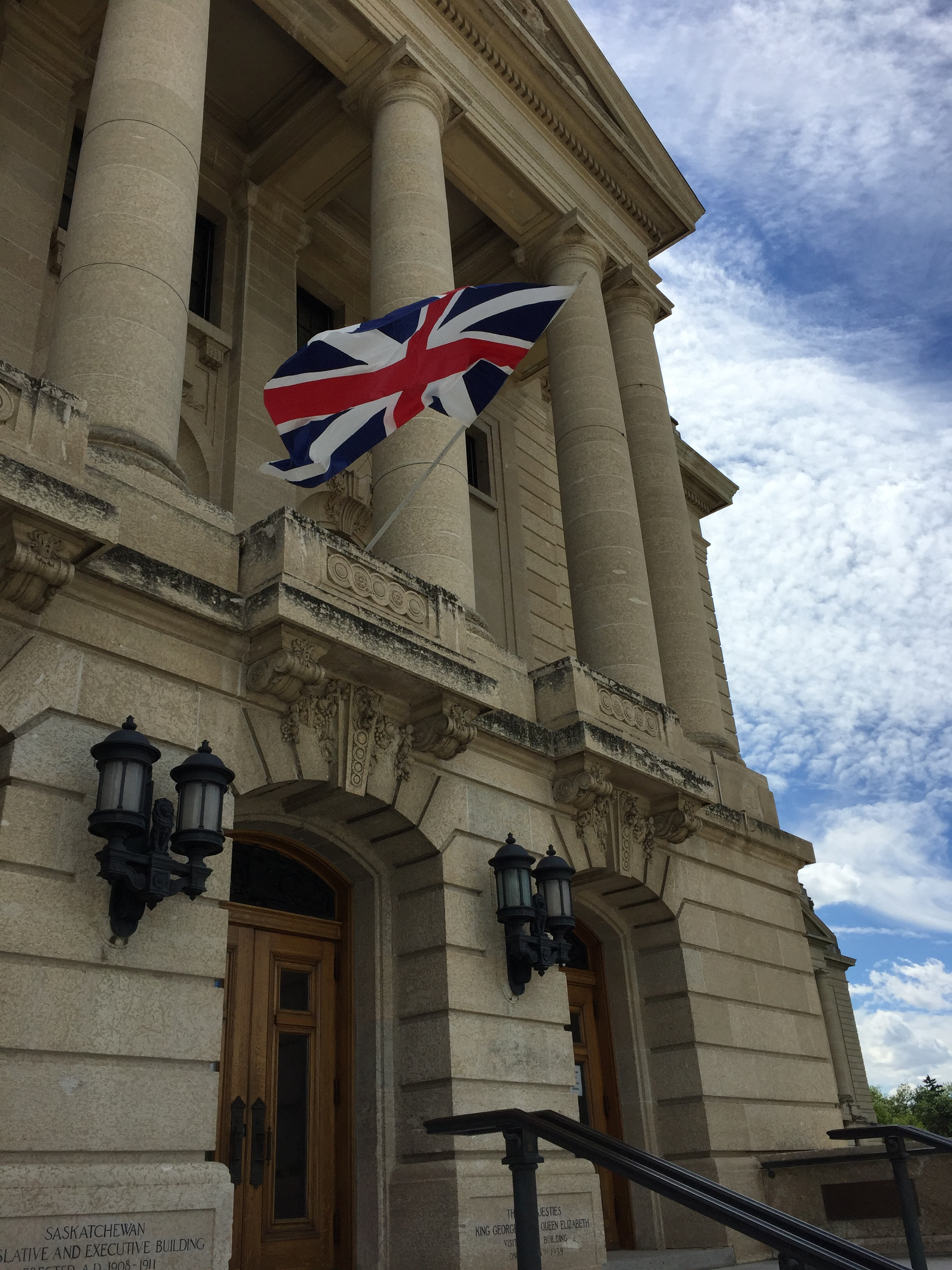
The Loyalist Flag flies at the Saskatchewan Legislative Building on UEL Day

In 1997, the Legislative Assembly of Ontario passed a bill declaring 19 June, "United Empire Loyalist Day" in Ontario. United Empire Loyalist Day is also celebrated on the same day in Saskatchewan, on 18 May in New Brunswick and on 22 July in British Columbia.

== Memory and historiography ==
The Loyalists paid attention to their history developing an idealized image of themselves in which they took great pride. In 1898, Henry Coyne provided a glowing depiction:

The Loyalists, to a considerable extent, were the very cream of the population of the Thirteen Colonies. They represented in very large measure the learning, the piety, the gentle birth, the wealth and good citizenship of the British race in America, as well its devotion to law and order, British institutions, and the unity of the Empire. This was the leaven they brought to Canada, which has leavened the entire Dominion of this day.

According to Canadian historians Margaret Conrad and Alvin Finkel, Coyne's memorial incorporates essential themes that have often been incorporated into patriotic celebrations. The Loyalist tradition, as explicated by Murray Barkley and Norman Knowles, includes:

The elite origins of the refugees, their loyalty to the British Crown, their suffering and sacrifice in the face of hostile conditions, their consistent anti-Americanism, and their divinely inspired sense of mission.

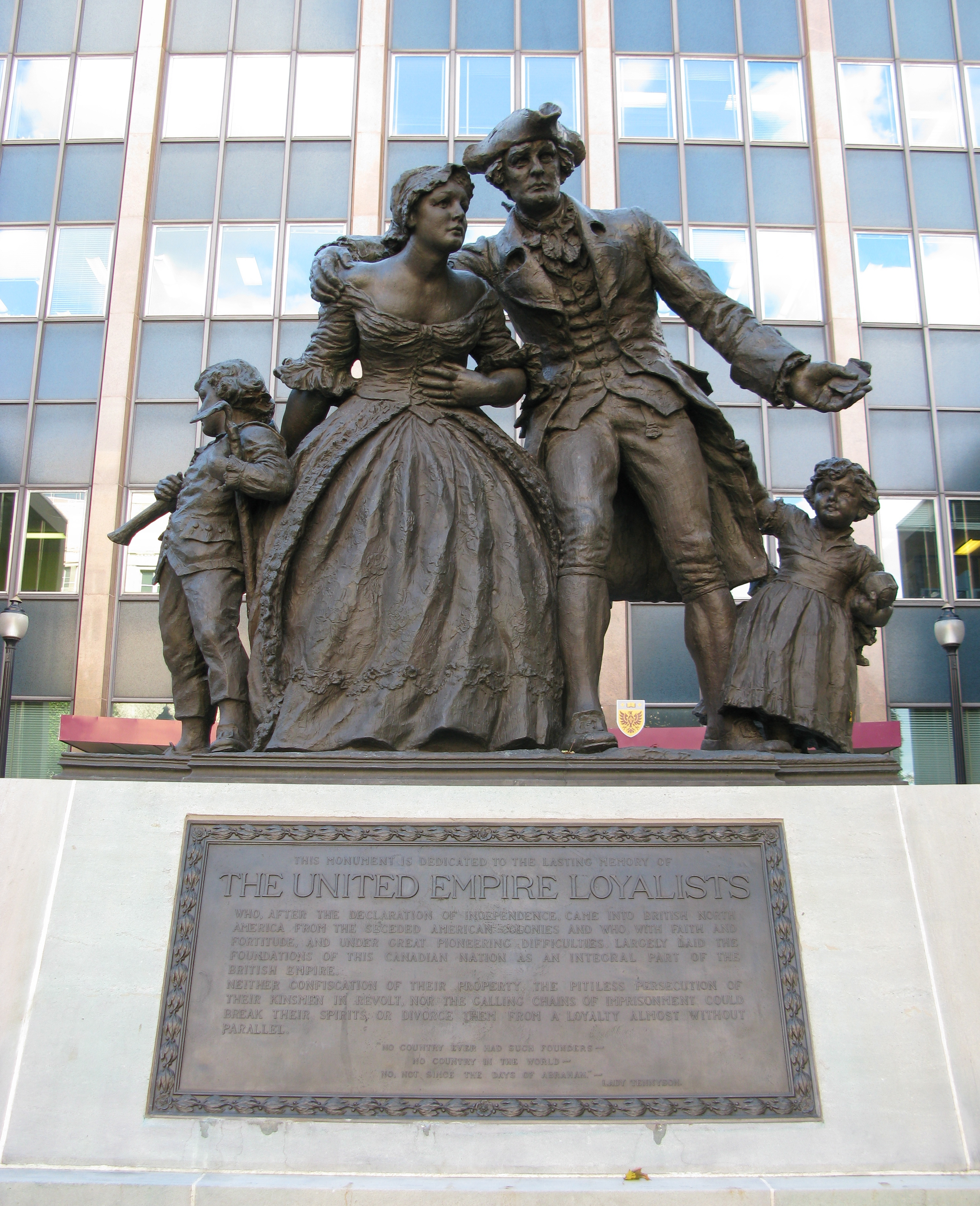
Monument by Sydney March to the United Empire Loyalists in Hamilton, Ontario.

Conrad and Finkel point out some exaggerations: only a small percentage of the Loyalists were colonial elite. In fact Loyalists were drawn from every stratum of colonial society, and few suffered violence and hardship. About 20% would later return to the United States. Most were loyal to all things British, but other Loyalists supported the United States in the War of 1812. Conrad and Finkel conclude:

[I]n using their history to justify claims to superiority, descendants of the Loyalists abuse the truth and actually diminish their status in the eyes of their non-Loyalists neighbours ... The scholars who argue that the Loyalists planted the seeds of Canadian liberalism or conservatism in British North America usually fail to take into account not only the larger context of political discussion that prevailed throughout the North Atlantic world, but also the political values brought to British North America by other immigrants in the second half of the 18th century.

From the 1870s, many of their descendants returned to the United States in pursuit of cheaper land. In the New England states alone, more than 10% of the population can trace their roots to the Maritime Provinces. Two million more of 14 million inhabitants, or roughly 15%, are part or wholly of French Canadian descent.

== United Empire Loyalists' Association ==
United Empire Loyalists' Association of Canada
- The association's coat of arms
- Abbreviation: UELAC
- Formation: 27 May 1914; 112 years ago
- Legal status: Charity
- Purpose: Cultural, historical, hereditary association
- Headquarters: George Brown House; 50 Baldwin Street, Suite 202; Toronto, Ontario, Canada
- Coordinates: 43.655825°N 79.39502°W
- President: Patricia Groom

The United Empire Loyalists' Association of Canada (UELAC) is an organization of Loyalist descendants and others interested in Canadian history, in particular the role of the United Empire Loyalists. The organization was incorporated on 27 May 1914 by the Legislative Assembly of Ontario. In 1972, the organization was granted a coat of arms from the College of Arms through a letter patent, dated 28 March 1972.

== Symbols ==
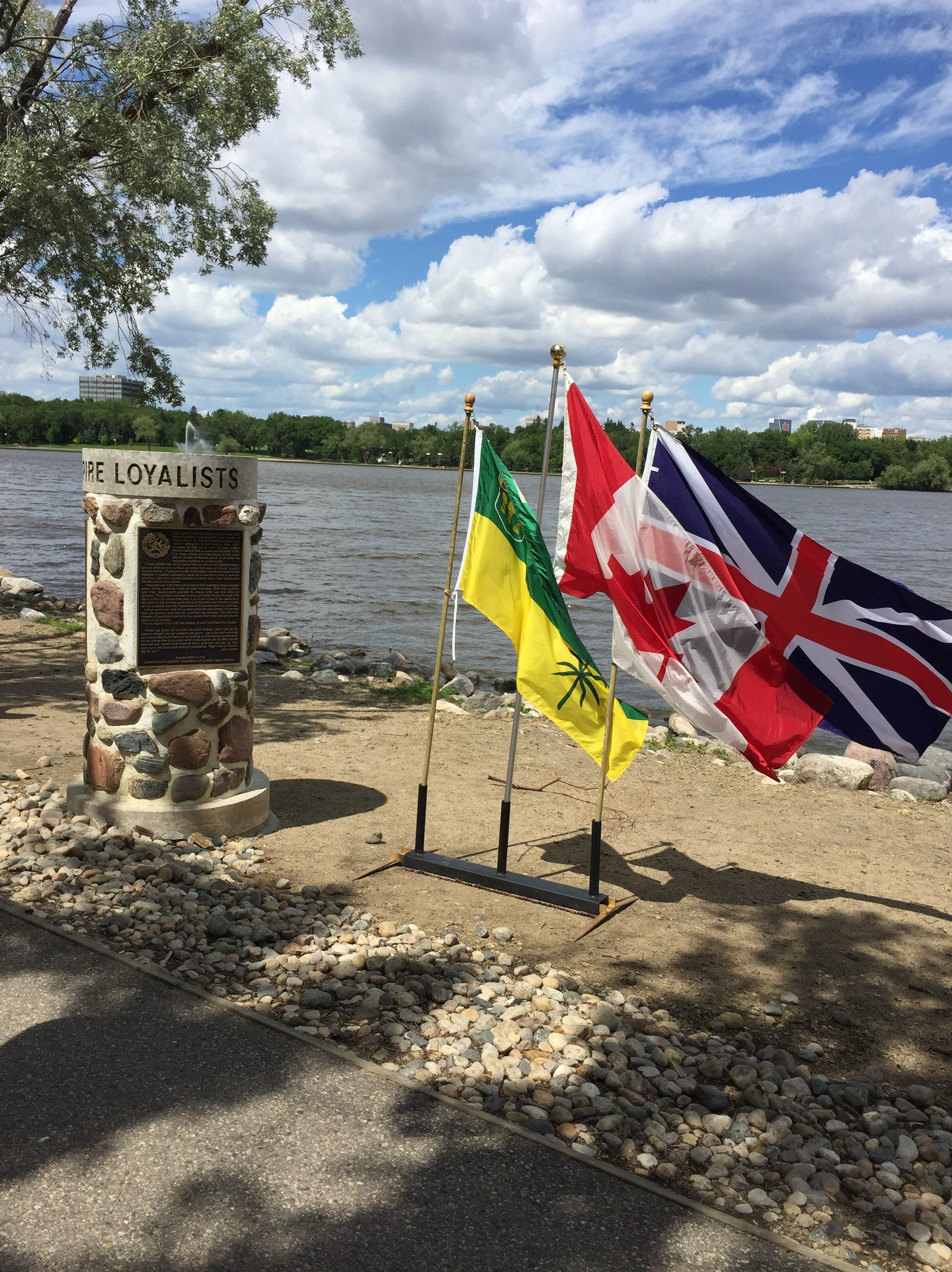
A loyalist flag (right foreground) at the cairn dedicated to Saskatchewan settlers of Loyalist ancestry

On 17 April 1707, Queen Anne issued a proclamation referencing the use of the Union Flag "at Sea and Land". The Union Flag began to appear on forts and as regimental colours from this point, and at the time of the American Revolution, this was the flag in use. When those loyal to the Crown left the United States for British North America, they took this flag with them, and because of this historical connection, it continues to be the official flag of the UELAC.

In Canadian heraldry since 1989, Loyalist descendants are entitled to use a Loyalist coronet in their coat of arms.

Loyalist military coronet

Loyalist civil coronet

== List of Loyalist settlements in Canada ==
18th-century names are listed first, alongside their present-day equivalents.

- Adolphustown, Ontario
- Antigonish, Nova Scotia
- Beamsville, Ontario
- Bocabec, New Brunswick
- Meyer's Creek → Belleville, Ontario
- Buell's Bay → Brockville, Ontario
- Butlersbury → Newark → Niagara-on-the-Lake, Ontario
- Cataraqui → Kingston, Ontario
- Clifton → Niagara Falls, Ontario
- Country Harbour, Nova Scotia
- Cobourg, Ontario
- Colchester → village now within Essex, Ontario
- Cornwall, Ontario
- Digby, Nova Scotia
- Doaktown, New Brunswick
- Eastern Townships, Quebec
- Effingham, Ontario
- Fredericton, New Brunswick
- Grimsby, Ontario
- Douglas Township → Kennetcook, Nova Scotia
- L'Amoreaux, Ontario
- Lincoln, Ontario
- Ernestown Township → Loyalist, Ontario
- Machiche → Yamachiche, Quebec
- Merrittsville → Welland, Ontario
- Milliken Corners Milliken, Ontario
- Gravelly Bay → Port Colborne, Ontario
- Port Roseway → Shelburne, Nova Scotia
- Prescott, Ontario
- Prince Edward County, Ontario
- Rawdon, Nova Scotia
- Saint John, New Brunswick
- Sheet Harbour, Nova Scotia
- Shelburne, Nova Scotia
- Six Nations and Brantford, Ontario
- Smithville, Ontario
- St. Andrews by-the-Sea → St. Andrews, New Brunswick
- St. Anne's Point → Fredericton, New Brunswick
- Summerville, Nova Scotia
- The Twelve → Shipman's Corners → St. Catharines, Ontario
- Turkey Point → Norfolk, Ontario
- Sandwich → Windsor, Ontario
- Odell Town, Quebec
- Wainfleet, Ontario
- Remsheg → Wallace, Nova Scotia
- Westchester, Nova Scotia
- York → Toronto, Ontario

== See also ==
- Expulsion of the Loyalists
- Loyalist (American Revolution)
- Canadian honorifics
- Daughters of the American Revolution
- Society of the Cincinnati
- Sons of the American Revolution
- Sons of the Revolution
- History of monarchy in Canada
