= Philadelphia Boulevard =

Wharf located on the right bank of the Vistula River in Toruń, Poland

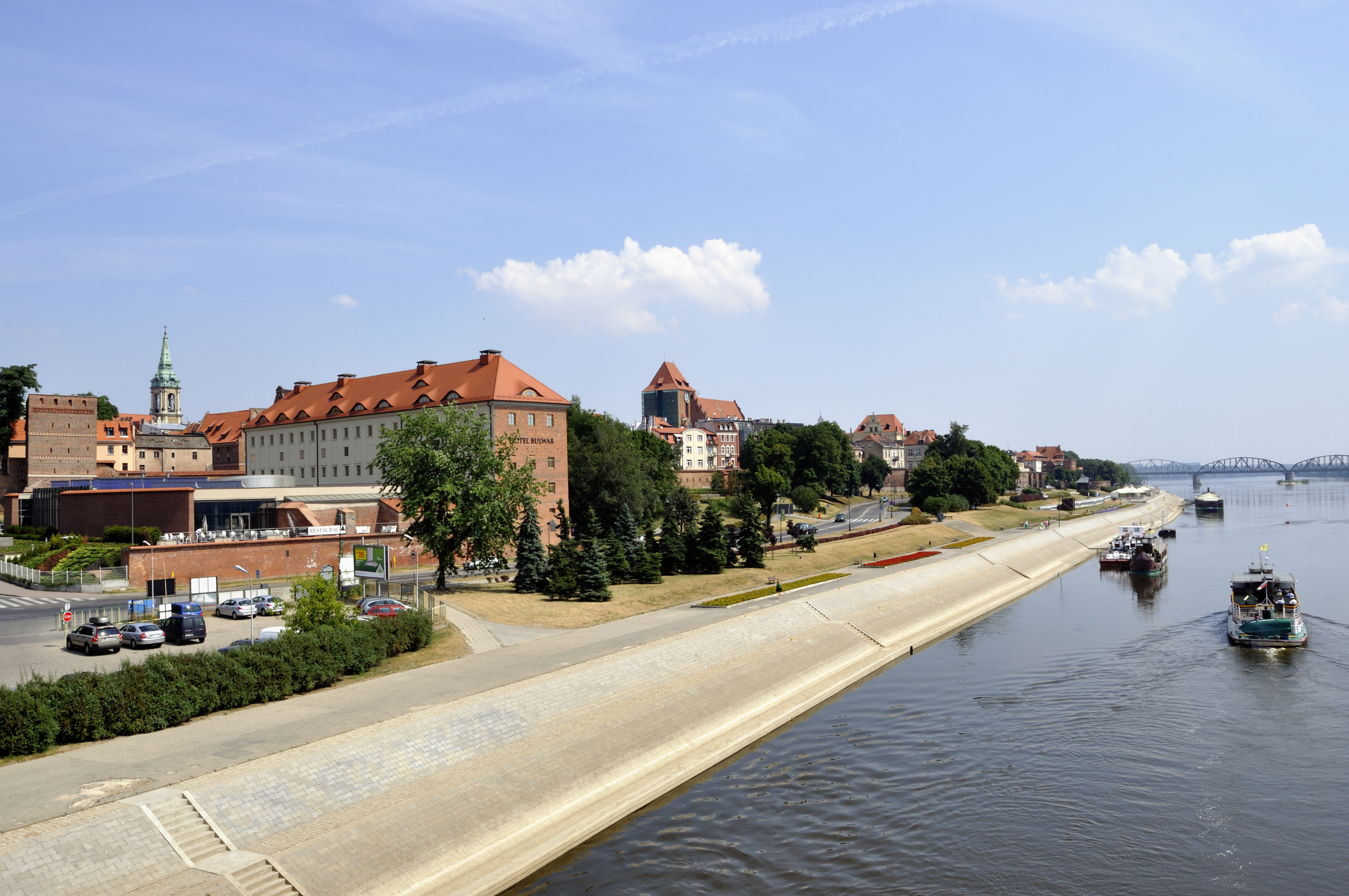
Boulevard as seen from Józef Piłsudski Road Bridge

The Philadelphia Boulevard in Toruń is a wharf located on the right bank of the Vistula River in Toruń, Poland.

== Location ==
The boulevard is located on the right bank of the city, between the Old Town Complex and the Vistula. The 2 km long wharf starts at the AZS marina and ends at the E. Malinowski Railway Bridge.

== History ==
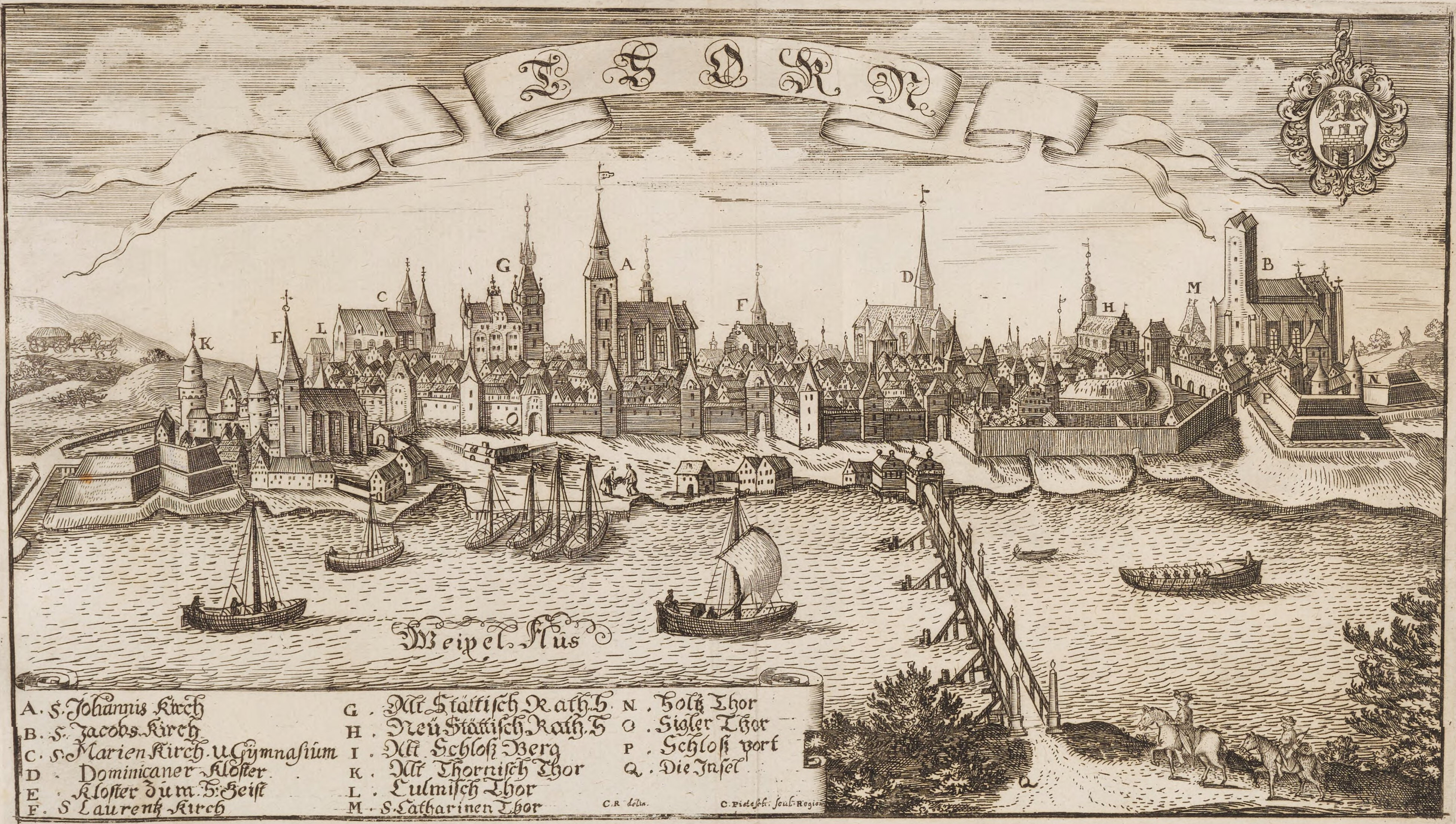
The 1684 wharf

Since the foundation of the city until the 1960s, the wharf at the height of the Old Town Complex served as a harbour and a commercial centre. During the period of Toruń's membership in the Hanseatic League, sea ships arrived here, and the city itself was then one of the largest riverside Hanseatic port centers.

In the Prussian period, after the construction of the Timber Port in the western part of the city in 1909, the authorities of that time planned to liquidate the port and replace it with boulevards.

In the interwar period, in 1935, 3900 ships and 2618 berlinks (smaller commercial ships) arrived at the port. The ships transported mainly sugar, flour, barley and oats. Apart from Polish vessels, ships and berlinks sailing under the flags of the Free City of Danzig, Weimar Germany and Sweden were also docking in the port.

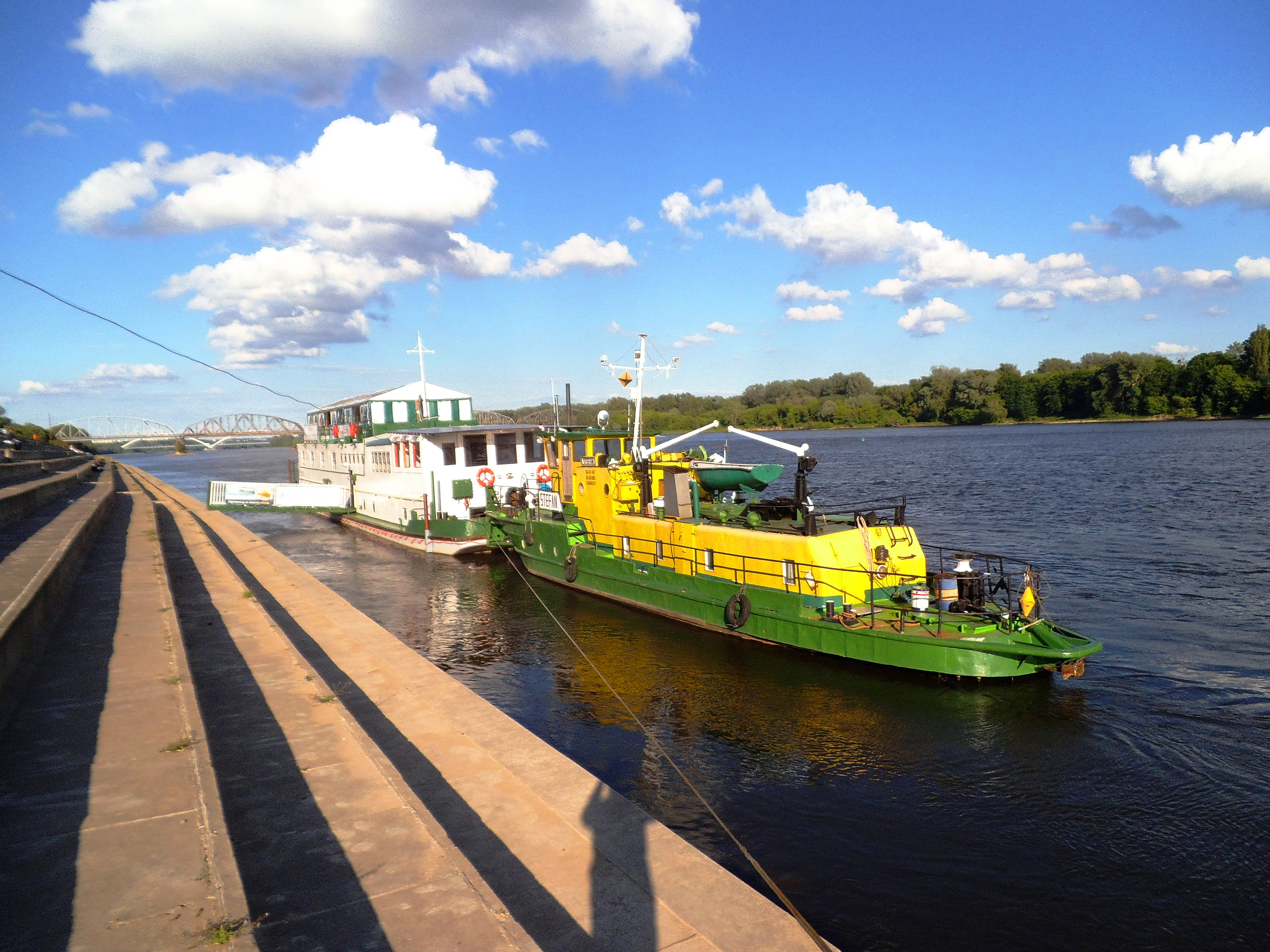
Philadelphia Boulevard, contemporary view

At that time, the then architect of the city, Ignacy Tłoczek, was also planning to build the boulevards. His plan spanned from the City Park in Bydgoskie Przedmieście to the area of the current E. Zawacka Road Bridge. The outbreak of the Second World War jeopardized these plans.

In the 1960s, as a result of the decreasing popularity of river transport in Poland, the port was liquidated. Lifts and port cranes were removed and the railway tracks were dismantled.

Construction of the waterfront in its current form began in the late 1960s and ended in 1973 to celebrate the 500th anniversary of Copernicus's birth. It was named the Philadelphia Boulevard in 1973, in honor of Toruń's American sister city (correspondingly, one of the city squares in Philadelphia is called the Toruń Triangle).

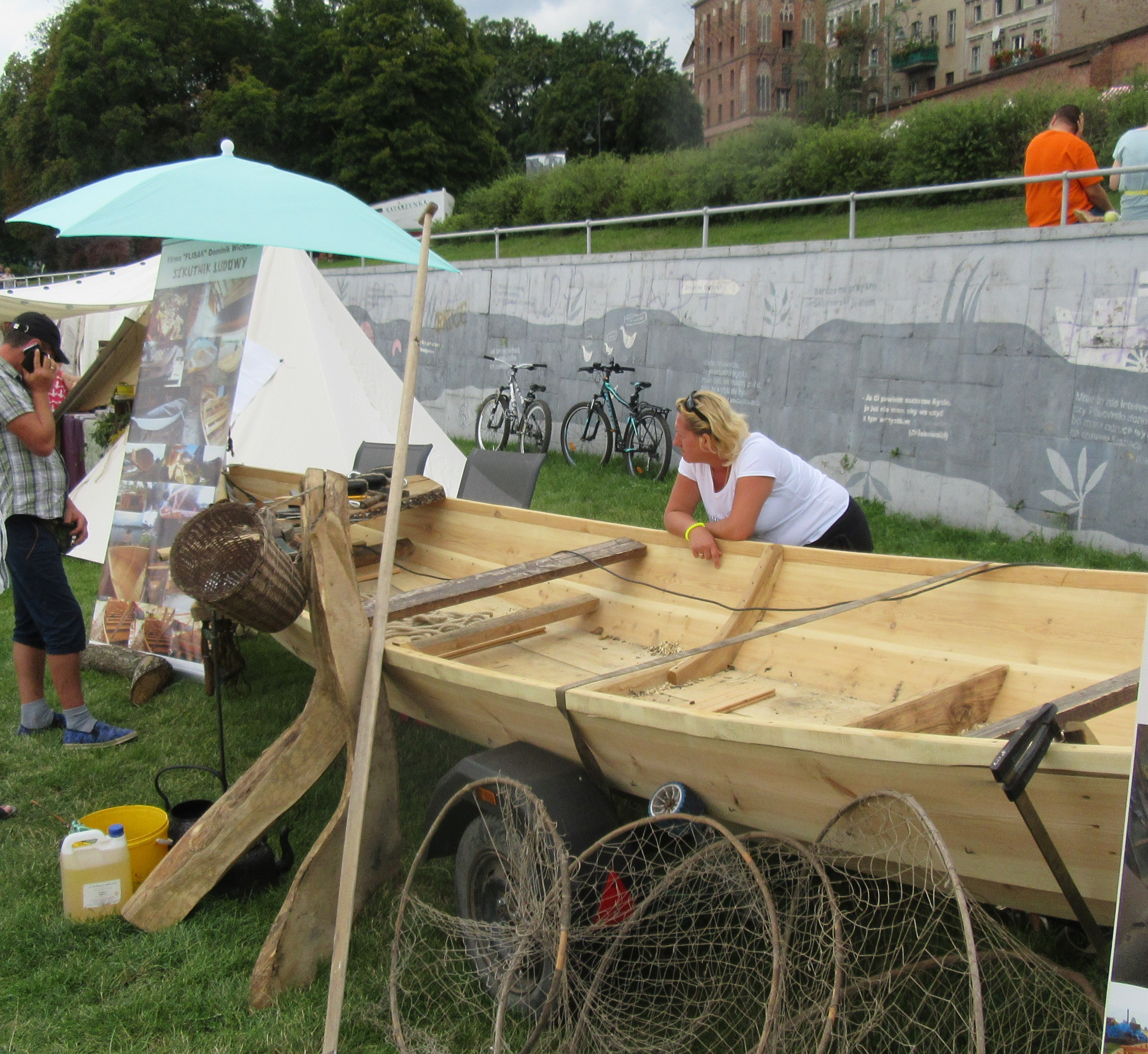
Vistula River Festival 2017 - demonstration of building a traditional Vistula boat

In 2005, the first stage of the renovation of the boulevard began on an almost 360-meter section between the Limnigraf and Wola Zamkowa Street. The steps were renovated and the trilinear paving was replaced with concrete dowels and granite cube. The second stage of renovation included the repair of the fortifications between the Józef Piłsudski Road Bridge and the Limnigraf. This stage was completed in 2007, while the third stage on the over 645-metre section between Wola Zamkowa and E. Malinowski Railway Bridge was completed in 2009.

In 2013, the wharf was renovated along the section from Józef Piłsudski Road Bridge to AZS marina, and a year later, its upper section was redeveloped. A beach, a playground, bicycle paths and a modern marina for yachts were completed.

In 2015, an urban and architectural concept for the development of the boulevard from Józef Piłsudski Road Bridge to E. Malinowski Railway Bridge was formulated. Basic architectural forms are to be created on the extension of the Old Town Complex e.g.: stairs with viewing platforms and catering pavilions. In addition, the concept also aims to limit traffic on the street, where pedestrians and cyclists will have priority. The boulevard will benefit from vegetation of different heights. The construction works are to start after 2020.

== Tourism ==
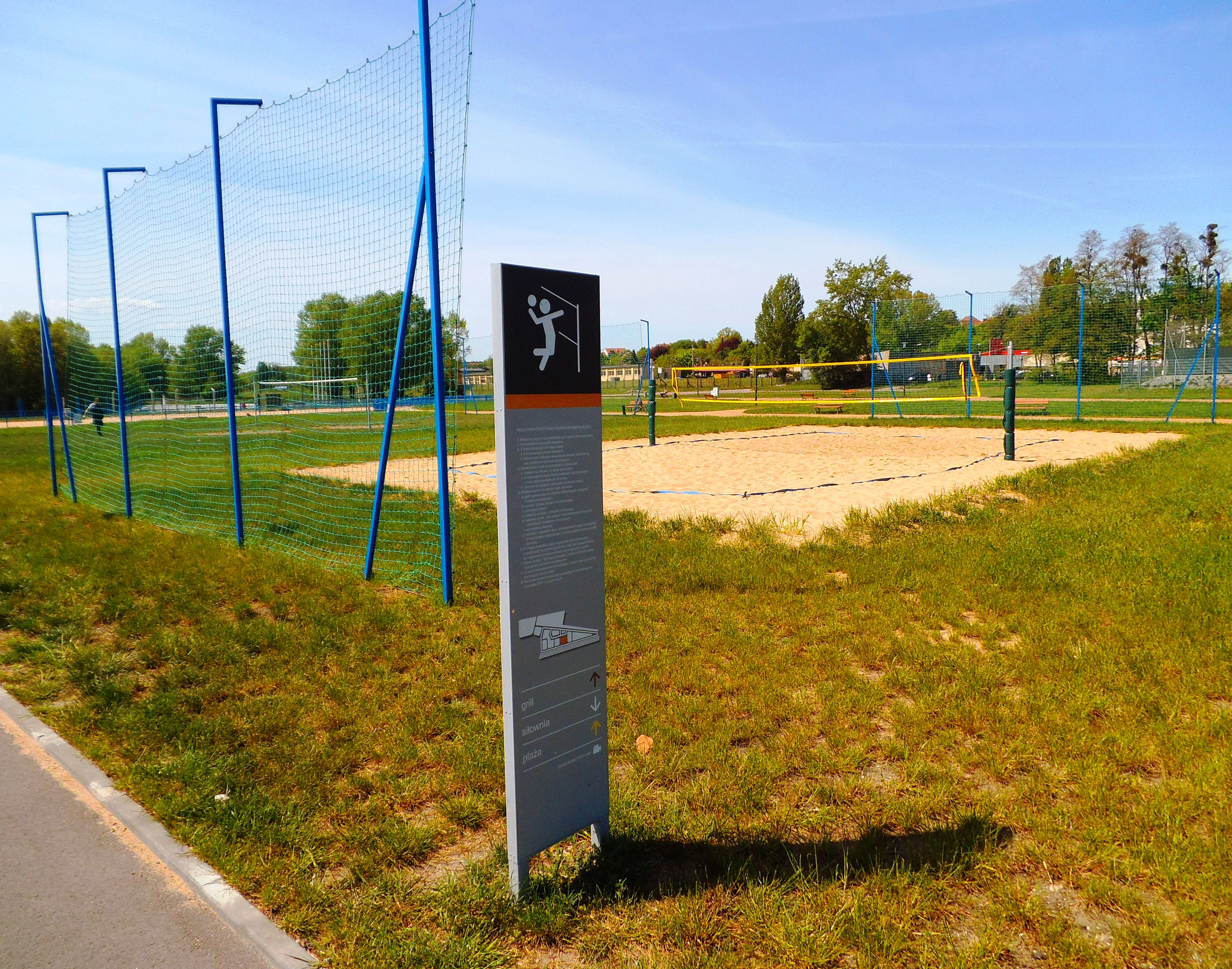
Playground

The boulevard is one of the most visited places in Toruń. According to the visitors, in 2013, after the Old Town Hall, Copernicus House, St. John's Cathedral and the Planetarium, it was one of the biggest attractions of the city.

== Culture ==
The boulevard hosts various cultural events and open-air historical demonstrations, such as Days of Toruń and the Vistula Festival.

== Interesting facts ==
- 1969 - the scenes for the film Cruise (pol. Rejs) directed by Marek Piwowski were shot here.
- On 3 May 1982, an anti-communist demonstration took place on the boulevard.
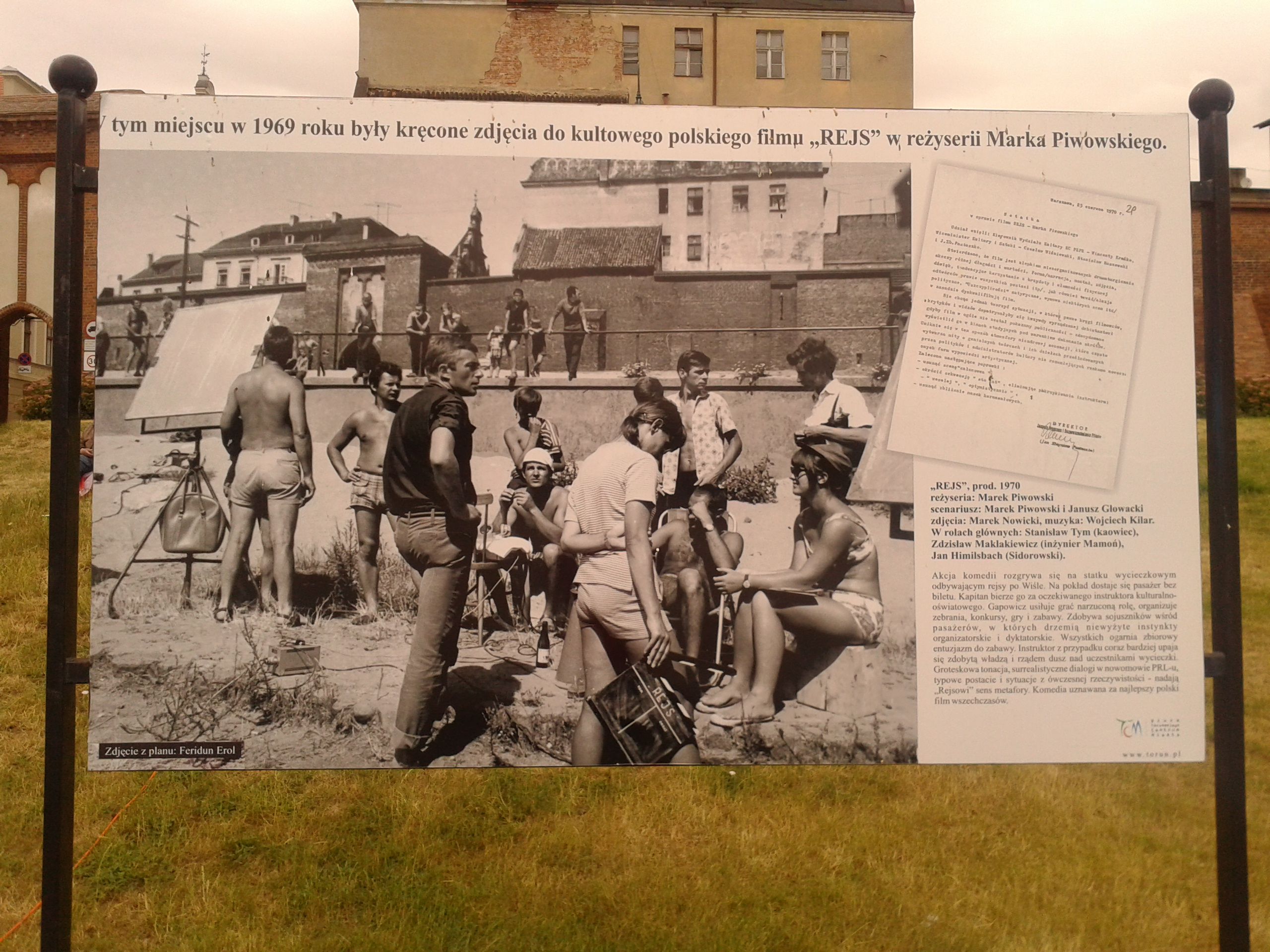
  In 1969 the scenes for the film Cruise (pol. Rejs) directed by Marek Piwowski were shot here

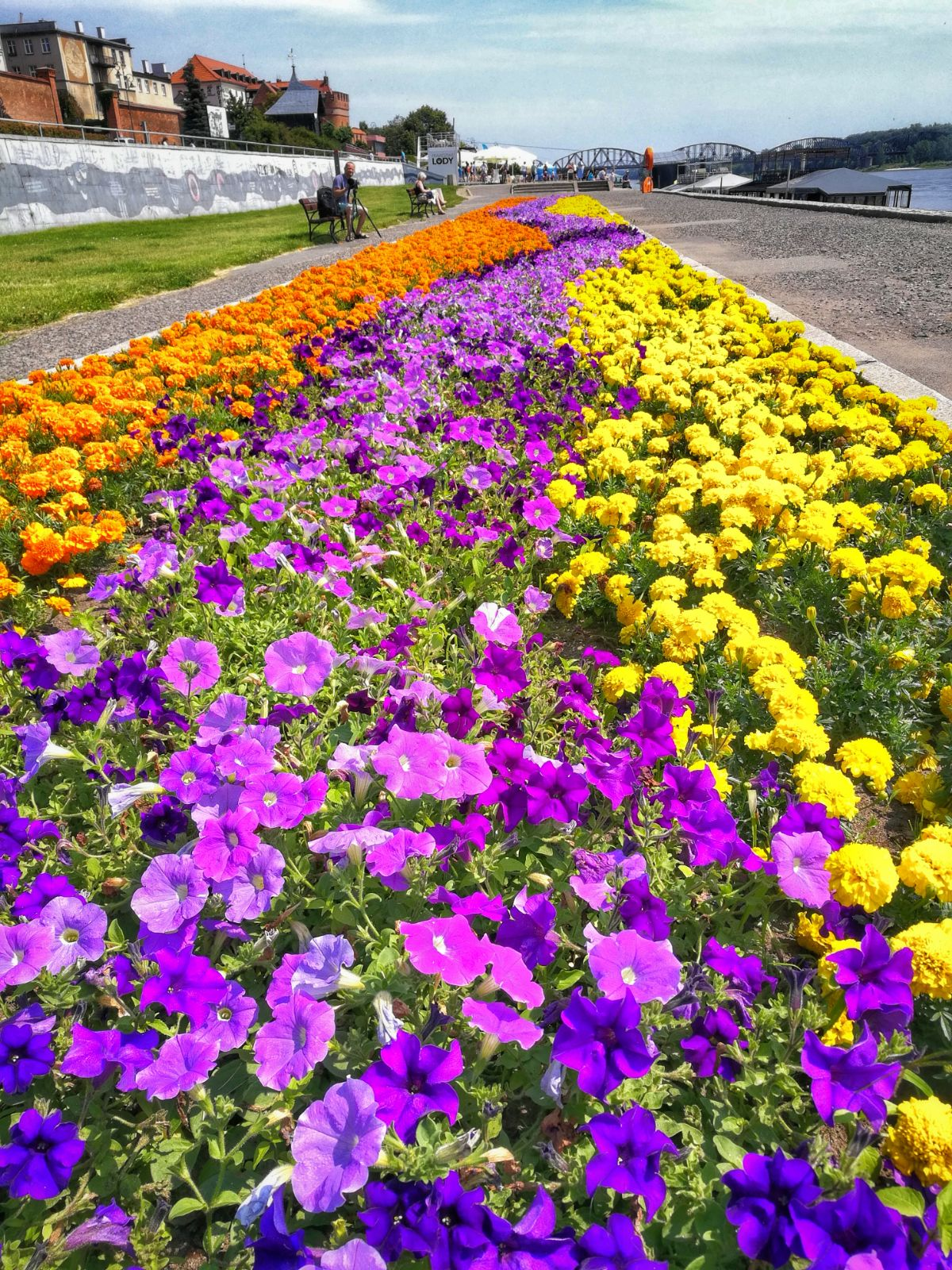
Summer on the boulevard, 2018

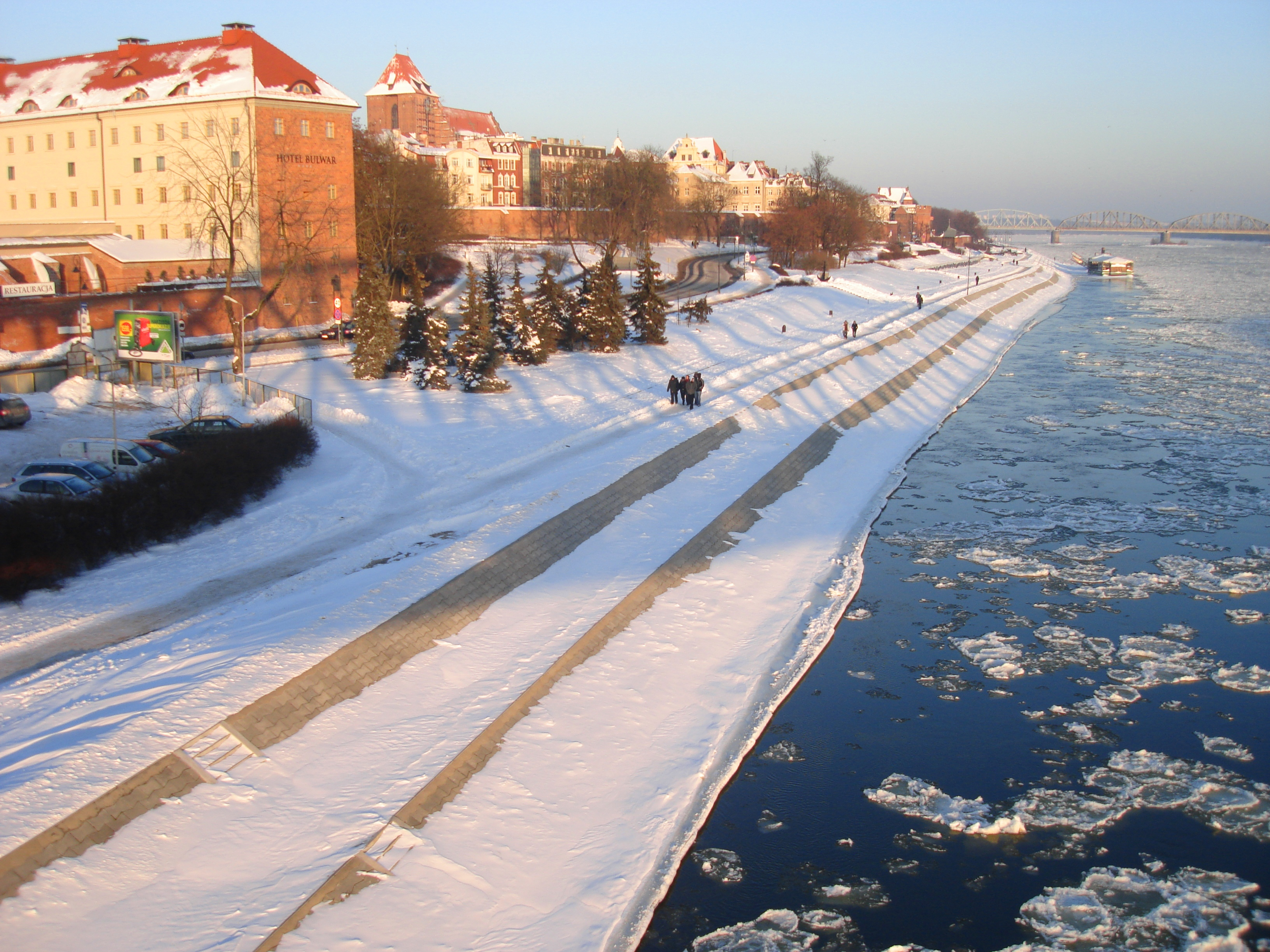
Winter, 2010

== Infrastructure ==
Picture	Title	Notes
	Marina for the ship "Katarzynka"	Sails on the Vistula in the tourist season
	Marina for the ship "Wanda"	Sails on the Vistula in the tourist season
	Limnigraph	Dates back to 1899
	Coach parking	
	Beach and a soccer field	
	AZS Marina	The marina serves the rowing section of the Academic Sports Club of the Nicolaus Copernicus University of Toruń (AZS), students of the Sports Championship School and Toruń sailing enthusiasts.
	Monument to the Navy Officers' School	Unveiled in 1972 on the 50th anniversary of the establishment of the Naval School in Toruń
	Katarzynka	Sailed from one bank of the Vistula to the other until 2000
	Lookout deck	Symbolizes the former bridge on the Vistula
