= Ashland, New York =

Ashland is the name of some places in the U.S. state of New York:

- Ashland, Chemung County, New York
- Ashland, Greene County, New York
