= Carrollton, Maryland =

- Census-designated place
- Location within the state of Maryland Carrollton (the United States)
- Coordinates: 39°33′24.73″N 76°55′5.53″W
- Country: United States
- State: Maryland
- County: Carroll
- Time zone: UTC-5 (Eastern (EST))
  - Summer (DST): UTC-4 (EDT)

Carrollton is a locality in eastern Carroll County, Maryland, United States.

It is not to be confused with Carrollton Manor in Frederick County, from which Charles Carroll of Carrollton, a prominent signer of the Declaration of Independence, took his name. It also should not be confused with New Carrollton, Maryland, which is located in Prince George's County. New Carrollton, a Washington suburb created in the 1950s, was originally also called "Carrollton, Maryland," until the name was changed in 1966.

Carrollton is located by the confluence of the Patapsco River's North and West Branches, around where Carrollton Road intersects Reese Road.
