= Westchester Valley =

Locality in Nova Scotia, Canada

Coordinates: 45°35′34.01″N 63°44′13.24″W

Westchester Valley in Nova Scotia

Westchester Valley is a locality in the Canadian province of Nova Scotia, located in Cumberland County.
