= Westchester, Nova Scotia =

Westchester, Nova Scotia may refer to:

- Westchester Mountain, Nova Scotia, a community in Cumberland County
- Westchester Station, Nova Scotia a railway point and community in Cumberland County
- Westchester Valley, Nova Scotia a locality in Cumberland County
