= Federal funds =

Overnight borrowings between US banks

In the United States, federal funds are loans between regulated financial institutions. Those with funds in excess of federal requirements can lend to those with reserve deficiencies. These loans are usually made for one day only, that is, "overnight". This facilitates compliance with Federal Reserve System reserve requirements and processing of financial transactions.

The interest rate is called the federal funds rate. Federal funds are not collateralized; like eurodollars, they are an unsecured interbank loan.

Federal funds transactions neither increase nor decrease total reserves in the banking system as a whole. Instead, they redistribute reserves. Before 2008, this meant that otherwise idle funds could yield a return. (Since 2008, the Fed has paid interest on bank reserves, including excess reserves.)

Federal funds are definitive money, meaning that they are available for immediate spending, while checks and many other forms of money must be cleared by banks and typically take several days before becoming available for spending.

Participants in the federal funds market include commercial banks, savings and loan associations, government-sponsored enterprises, branches of foreign banks in the United States, federal agencies, and securities firms. Many relatively small institutions that accumulate reserves in excess of their requirements lend reserves overnight to money centers and large regional banks, as well as to foreign banks operating in the United States. Federal agencies also lend idle funds in the federal funds market.

The Fed, which is the central bank of the United States, conducts monetary policy primarily by targeting a certain range for the federal funds rate. If the Fed wishes to move to a more expansionary monetary policy, it conducts open market operations, which include primarily bank reserves; since this puts more liquidity into the banking system, it pushes down the federal funds rate.

== See also ==
- Arbitrage
- Discount rate
- Opportunity cost
- Libor
- Repurchase agreement
