= The Hundred Year Association of New York =

Non-profit organization in New York City

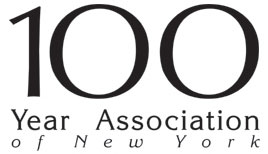
Logo of The Hundred Year Association of New York

The Hundred Year Association of New York, founded in 1927, is a non-profit organization in New York City that recognizes and rewards dedication and service to the City of New York by businesses and organizations that have been in operation in the city for a century or more and by individuals who have devoted their lives to the city as city employees.

== Membership ==
Any association, corporation, partnership or individual proprietorship whose continuity in its own right, or as successor to an organization in business for over 100 years is eligible for membership. Organizations 75 years or older may join as associate members. Individuals can join the association's "Century Society.'

Notable current members include ConEdison, National Grid, The Chief-Leader, The Brooklyn Bar Association, Rosenwach Tank Company, John Gallin & Son, Hagedorn & Company, Leys, Christie & Company, Modell's Sporting Goods, Pfizer, Henry W. T. Mali & Company, New York University, Paul, Hastings, Janofsky & Walker, Bowne & Co., General Hardware, Modell Financial, The New York Post, Dancker, Sellew & Douglas, James Thompson & Co., The Guardian Life Insurance Company of America, Bank of New York Mellon, Richmond County Savings Bank, E. J. Electric, Emmet, Marvin & Martin, Scientific American, STV Group, The Hotel Wales, The Delta Kappa Epsilon Club of New York and Ferrara Cafe.

== Officers ==
The association is led by elected officers and a board of governors. The most recent chairman, Richard A. Cook, died in June 2007 after a long illness. The current president is Clinton W. Blume, III. The association's Secretary is Luke Vander Linden. Past presidents have included James A. Farley.

== Public service awards and college scholarships ==
Initiated in 1958, the association grants the "Isaac Liberman Public Service Awards" annually to career New York City civil servants who have excelled beyond their normal duties during the course of the year. Employees are nominated by their supervisor and department's commissioner or director and awards are determined by the association's Awards Committee in conjunction with the City of New York's Department of Citywide Administrative Services. The public service awards are named for Isaac Liberman, founder of The Hundred Year Association when he was president of Arnold Constable & Company in Brooklyn.

The annual "E. Virgil Conway College Scholarships" are awarded to the sons and daughters of New York City employees every year. They are named after E. Virgil Conway, who conceived of the scholarship program in 1971.

More than $1,600,000 has been granted since the awards program's inception.

== Gold Medal Awards ==
Each year since 1930, the association has presented its 'Gold Medal Award' "in recognition of outstanding contributions to the City of New York." While typically presented to a single individual, the award has been granted on occasion to more than one person or an organization.

Past winners have been:

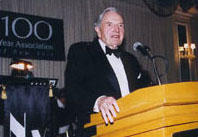
1965 Gold Medal Award winner David Rockefeller

1930 Julius Miller
1931 Harvey Dow Gibson
1932 Justice Samuel Seabury
1933 Grover A. Whalen
1934 Robert Moses
1935 John D. Rockefeller Jr.
1936 Thomas E. Dewey
1937 James Speyer
1938 Eleanor Robson Belmont
1939 Cleveland E. Dodge (Phelps Dodge & Co.)
1940 Fiorello H. La Guardia
1946 Francis Spellman, Helen Rogers Reid
1947 Frederick H. Ecker

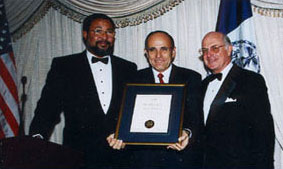
Former Mayor Rudolph W. Giuliani receives the association's 1998 Gold Medal Award, presented by Time Warner President Richard D. Parsons and Former Association President Richard A. Cook.

1948 William O'Dwyer
1949 Millicent C. McIntosh
1950 Oscar Hammerstein II, Richard Rodgers
1951 Alfred P. Sloan
1952 Howard S. Cullman (Philip Morris, Port of New York Authority)
1953 John Hay Whitney
1954 Arthur Hays Sulzberger
1955 Brigadier General David Sarnoff
1956 Robert F. Wagner Jr.
1957 Keith S. McHugh (New York Telephone)
1958 Samuel D. Leidesdorf
1959 John D. Rockefeller III
1960 Howard A. Rusk
1961 Minnie Guggenheimer (music patron and philanthropist)
1962 James A. Farley

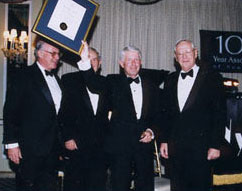
1999 Gold Medal Awardee Robert R. Douglass and Dinner Chairman and 2002 Gold Medal Honoree Charles J. Urstadt

1963 Paul R. Screvane
1964 Edmund F. Wagner (Seamen's Bank for Savings)
1965 David Rockefeller
1966 Austin J. Tobin
1967 John A. Coleman
1968 Gustave Levy
1969 J. Victor Herd (Continental Insurance Company)
1970 Jack I. Straus (R. H. Macy & Company)
1971 William S. Renchard (Chemical Bank)
1972 Robert S. Curtiss (Port Authority of New York and New Jersey)
1973 Gilbert W. Fitzhugh
1974 Leonard H. Goldenson
1975 George Champion (Chase Manhattan Bank)
1976 William M. Ellinghaus (American Telephone and Telegraph Company)
1977 Ellmore C. Patterson (Morgan Guaranty Trust Company)
1978 J. Henry Smith (The Equitable Life Assurance Society of the United States)
1980 Harry Helmsley
1981 Richard R. Shinn (Metropolitan Life)
1982 Museum of the City of New York
1983 Edward J. Mortola
1984 J. Peter Grace
1985 Gene F. Jankowski (CBS Broadcasting)
1986 E. Virgil Conway
1987 Edmund T. Pratt Jr.
1988 Delbert C. Staley (NYNEX)
1989 John J. Phelan Jr.
1990 Felix G. Rohatyn
1991 Carnegie Hall
1992 William R. Chaney (Tiffany & Co.)
1993 Tony Randall
1994 John McGillicuddy
1995 David A. Olsen

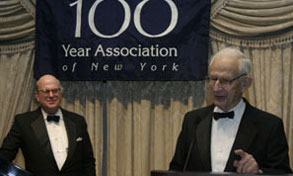
Manhattan District Attorney Robert M. Morgenthau speaks after receiving The Hundred Year Association's 2005 Gold Medal as Chairman Richard A. Cook looks on.

1996 Kenneth J. Gorman
1997 Simon J. Critchell (Cartier, L'Oréal)
1998 Rudolph W. Giuliani
1999 Robert R. Douglass (Alliance for Downtown New York)
2000 Robert M. Johnson
2001 Robert B. Catell (National Grid (US)), Charles J. Hamm (Independence Community Bank)
2002 Charles J. Urstadt
2003 Mark S. Sisk
2004 The New York Post
2005 Robert M. Morgenthau
2006 Raymond W. Kelly
2007 John C. Cushman III
2008 Hon. Michael R. Bloomberg
2009 The Guardian Life Insurance Company of America
2010 Ralph K. Smith
2011 The Crew of US Airways Flight 1549
2012 Dominick M. Servedio. P.E. (STV Group)
2013 Joseph E. Spinnato (Hotel Association of New York)
2014 Actors Fund of America
2015 Jaros, Baum & Bolles, New York City Fire Department
2016 Richmond County Savings Bank
2017 Fordham University
2018 Joel A. Dolci
2019 New York Society of Association Executives
