= New York Trust Company =

American financial corporation (1904–1959)

The logo of New York Trust Company

The New York Trust Company was a large trust and wholesale-banking business that specialized in servicing large industrial accounts. The New York Trust Company merged with the Chemical Corn Exchange Bank, and the new entity eventually became known as Chemical Bank.

== History ==
=== 19th century ===
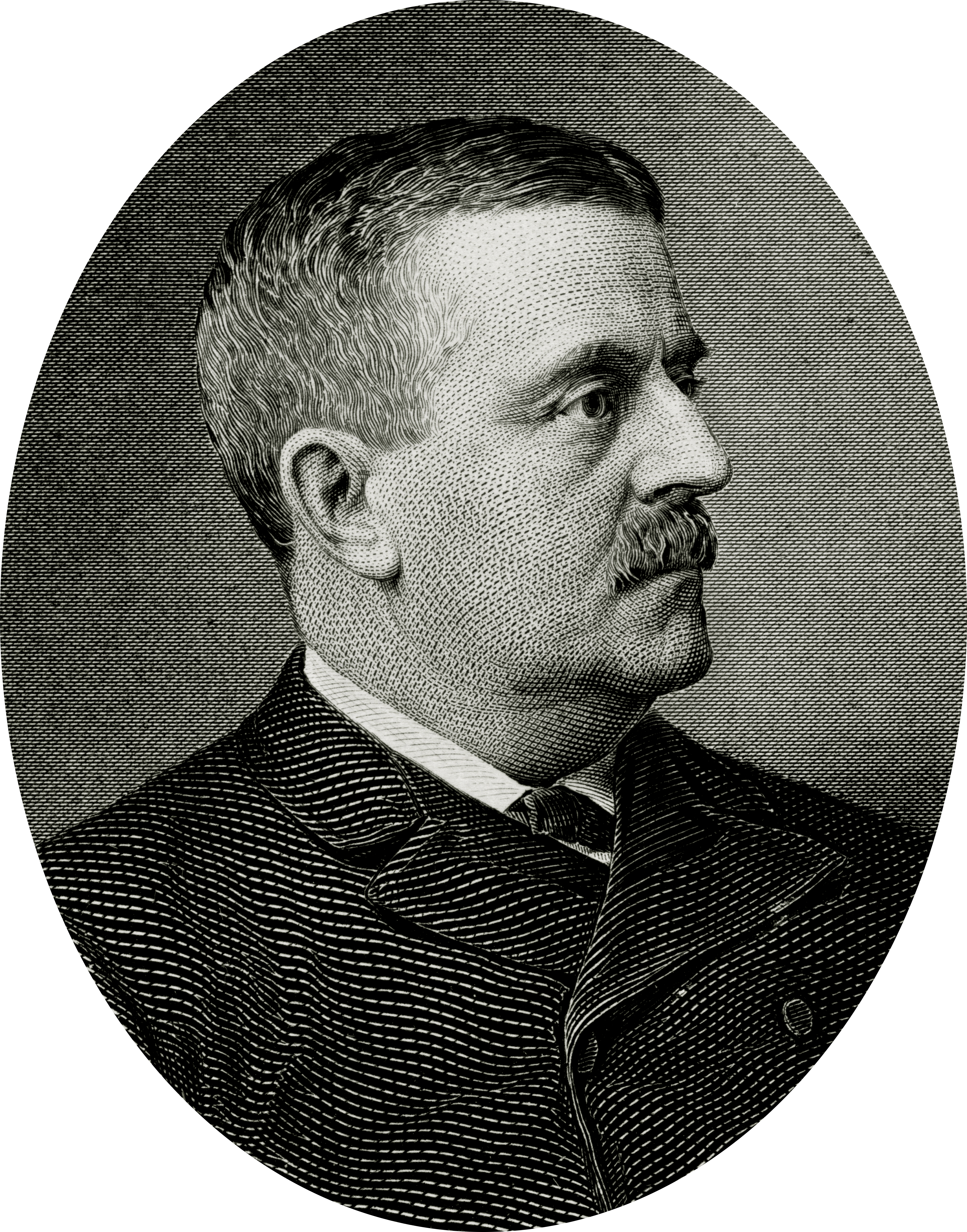
Charles S. Fairchild, the first president of New York Trust Company

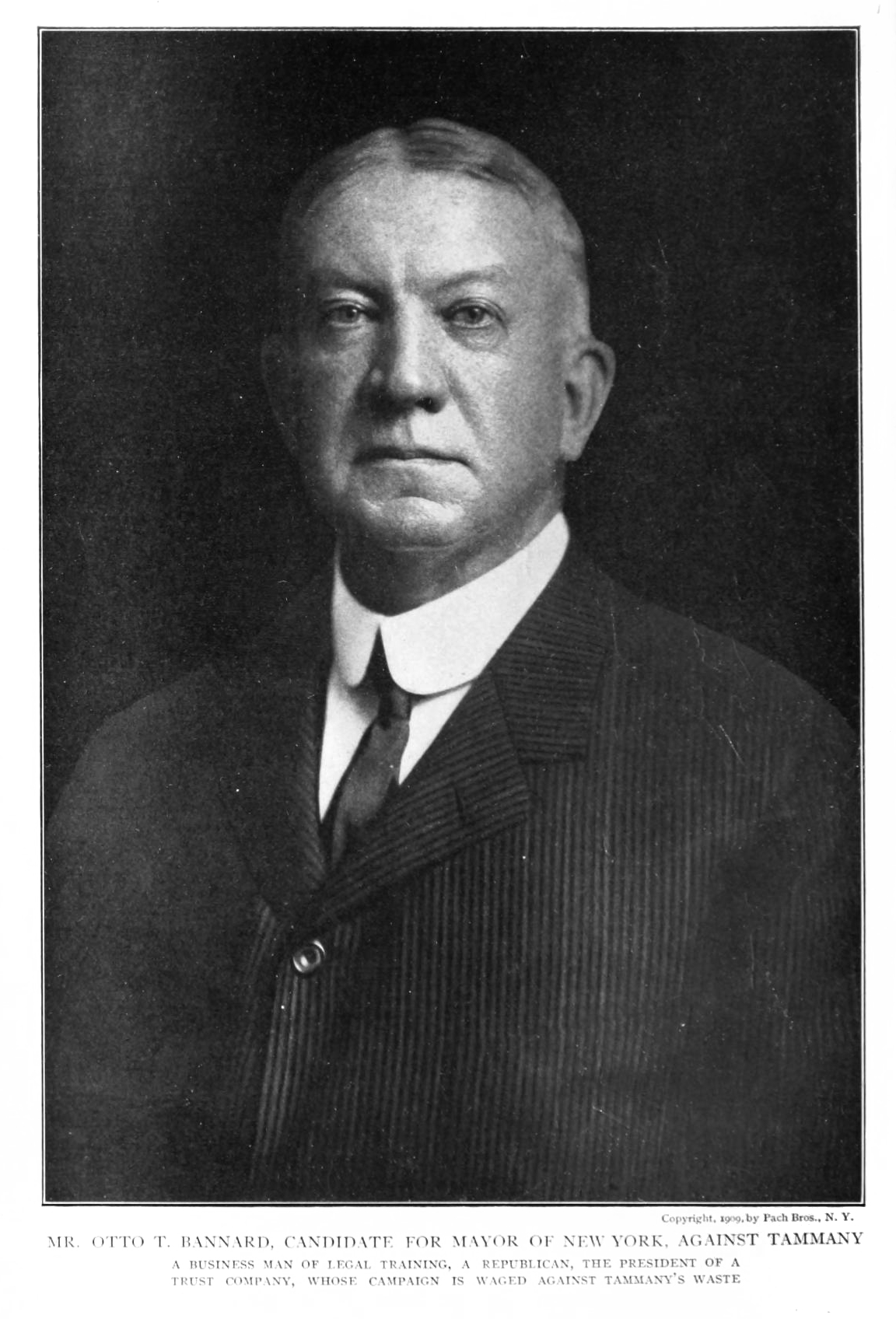
Otto T. Bannard, the company's second president

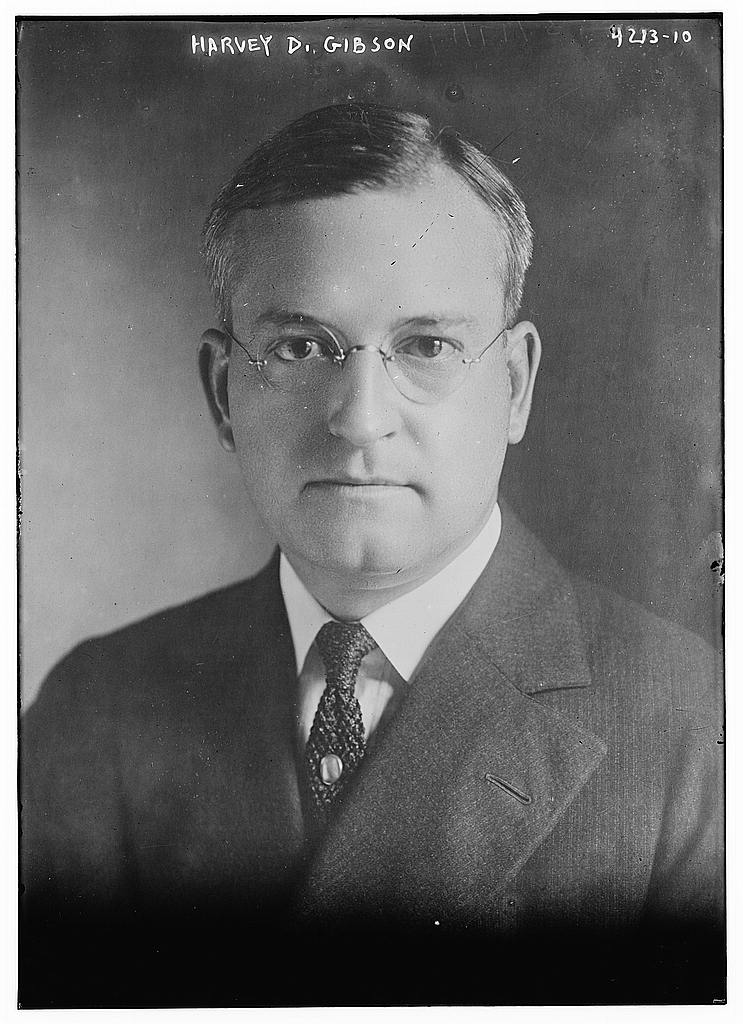
Harvey Dow Gibson, the company's fourth president

On April 3, 1889, the New York Security and Trust Company received its certificate of authorization and was formed with Charles S. Fairchild as the first president and "original capital" of $1,000,000. Fairchild, a former attorney general of New York under Governors Samuel J. Tilden and Lucius Robinson, was serving as the 38th United States Secretary of the Treasury under President Grover Cleveland immediately before the company's formation. (Note: Among those interested in the newly formed the New York Security and Trust Company were Roswell P. Flower, former governor of New York, William A. Booth, William Woodward Jr., William Henry Appleton of D. Appleton & Company publishers, Loomis L. White, William Lafayette Strong, William F. Buckley, C. C. Baldwin, S. G. Nelson, Hudson Hoagland, James J. Hill, James Stillman, W. H. Tillinghast, William H. Beers, and Congressman William Lawrence Scott of Erie, Pennsylvania.)

Fairchild previously was a partner in the Boston Brahmin investment banking firm of Lee, Higginson & Co.

=== 20th century ===
In 1904, the New York Security and Trust Company merged with the Continental Trust Company (which had been organized in 1890) under the New York Security and Trust name but occupied the offices of Continental Trust in the Blair & Co. Building on Broad Street. The new firm had $3,000,000 in capital. Fairchild became chairman of the board of trustees, and the president of Continental, Otto T. Bannard, became president of the new entity, which was renamed the New York Trust Company the following year, effective March 1, 1905.

In January 1916, Mortimer N. Buckner, who had worked with Bannard at Continental since 1901, succeeded Bannard as president of the New York Trust Company, while Bannard assumed the newly created position of chairman of the board and of the executive committee.

In December 1920, it was announced that the New York Trust Company, which was based at 24 Broad Street, would merge with Liberty National Bank of New York. Liberty, which had recently absorbed the Scandinavian Trust Company and was based out of the Equitable Building, had been formed in 1891. After the merger, Buckner succeeded Bannard as chairman of the board, and Harvey Dow Gibson, the former president of Liberty, became president of the New York Trust Company. Past presidents of Liberty included such prominent bankers as Henry P. Davison, Thomas Cochran, and Seward Prosser. The merged bank had capital of $10,000,000 and "undivided profits and surplus of nearly $20,000,000." It occupied offices that had been prepared for Liberty in the American Surety Company Building at 100 Broadway. (Note: After the consolidation of the institutions, the board of trustees of the New York Trust Company were: Otto T. Bannard, chairman; Mortimer N. Buckner, Thomas Cochran, J.P. Morgan & Co.; James Colby Colgate, James B. Colgate & Co., Edmund C. Converse, New York; Alfred A. Cook, Leventritt, Cook, Nathan & Lehman; Arthur Cumnock, Catlin & Co.; Otis H. Cutler, chairman, American Brake Shoe and Foundry Company; Henry P. Davison, J.P. Morgan & Co.; Robert W. DeForest, De Forest Brothers; George Doubleday, president, Ingersoll-Rand Company; Russell H. Dunham, president, Hercules Powder Company; Samuel H. Fisher, New York; John A. Garver, Shearman & Sterling; Harvey Dow Gibson, president, Liberty National Bank of New York; Thomas Andrew Gillespie, chairman, T. A. Gillespie Company; Charles Hayden, Hayden, Stone & Co.; Lyman N. Hine, president, American Cotton Oil Company; Frank Norton Hoffstot, president, Pressed Steel Car Company; Henry Carnegie Phipps, New York; Walter Jennings, New York; Darwin P. Kingsley, president, New York Life Insurance Company; Edward Eugene Loomis, president of Lehigh Valley Railroad; Howard W. Maxwell, vice president, Atlas Portland Cement Company; Ogden L. Mills, New York; Edward S. Moore, vice president, Beech-Nut Packing Company. Junius Spencer Morgan II, J.P. Morgan & Co.; Grayson M. P. Murphy, Grayson M. P. Murphy & Co.; Charles W. Riecks, vice president, Liberty National Bank; Dean Sage, Zabriskie, Sage, Kerr & Gray.)

In 1921, the United States Supreme Court heard arguments on April 25 and 26, 1921, in New York Trust Co. v. Eisner, a case that involved the New York Trust Company as executors of the will of J. H. Purdy against M. Eisner. Justice Oliver Wendell Holmes Jr. delivered the opinion of the court on May 16, 1921, where the judgment was affirmed with costs.

In 1929, Artemus L. Gates succeeded Gibson as president of New York Trust, becoming "the youngest president of a large downtown New York bank." The 34-year-old Gates (who was the son-in-law of the late Henry P. Davison, a former Liberty National Bank president) had started his career in 1919 with Liberty National Bank, going to New York Trust after the 1920 merger and becoming a vice president in 1926. Gates became chairman of the executive committee, and Buckner remained chairman of the board of trustees.

As of June 30, 1941, New York Trust reported total assets of $694,659,000. In 1941, John E. Bierwirth succeeded Gates as president of New York Trust. Gates resigned the presidency after being appointed the Assistant Secretary of the Navy for Aeronautics by President Franklin D. Roosevelt.

In 1949, the New York Trust Company acquired the Fulton Trust Company of New York under the terms of a cash merger agreement involving a purchase price of $5,000,000 (i.e., $250 a share for 20,000 shares of Fulton Trust). Bierwith remained president of New York Trust, which had assets of $670,836,167, and Arthur J. Morris, the president of Fulton Trust (which had assets of $36,158,041), became a vice president of the new firm. Charles S. McVeigh, the chairman of Fulton Trust, and three other Fulton Trust trustees, namely Stephen C. Clark, Charles J. Nourse, and Walter N. Stillman, were added to the board of New York Trust, increasing it from eighteen members to twenty-two.

In late 1949, Bierwirth left New York Trust to assume the presidency of the National Distillers Products Corporation and was succeeded by Charles J. Stewart, who had been with New York Trust since 1930. Hulbert Aldrich served as director and president of the company from 1950 through 1959.

In 1952, the New York Trust Company management completed a merger deal with the Manufacturers Trust Company involving an exchange of 1 2/3 shares of Manufacturers Trust for each share of New York Trust. New York Trust president Charles J. Stewart was to have become president of Manufacturers Trust in the proposed merger, but New York Trust shareholders protested the arrangement as "not sufficiently rewarding and the agreement was dissolved." After the deal ended, Stewart resigned and shortly afterward became a general partner of the investment bank Lazard Frères & Company. In 1959, however, Stewart left Lazard Frères to become president of Manufacturers Trust Company, as had been proposed in 1952.

By 1958, the bank's largest shareholder was a holding company representing the Henry Phipps estate.

In 1959, the New York Trust Company, which was largely a wholesale institution, merged with the Chemical Corn Exchange Bank, largely a "retail" institution, creating the Chemical Bank New York Trust Company, the third largest bank in New York City and the fourth largest in the nation. Before the merger, New York Trust, with seven offices, was the ninth largest in New York, and Chemical Corn, with ninety-four offices, was the fourth largest. Chemical Corn's chairman and president, Harold H. Helm, remained in those roles post merger, while Adrian M. Massie, the chairman of New York Trust, became chairman of the trust committee and general supervisor of the combined trust departments. New York Trust's president, Hulbert S. Aldrich, became vice chairman of the board along with Gilbert H. Perkins, who held the post at Chemical Corn.

== Notable personnel ==
- Charles S. Fairchild, president from 1889 to 1904 (former attorney general of New York and United States Secretary of the Treasury).
- Otto T. Bannard, president from 1904 to 1916 (who ran for mayor of New York in 1909 but lost).
- Mortimer N. Buckner, president from 1916 to 1921 (later president of the New York Clearing House).
- Harvey Dow Gibson, president from 1921 to 1929 (later president of the Manufacturers Trust Company).
- Artemus L. Gates, president from 1929 to 1941 (who became Assistant Secretary of the Navy for Aeronautics).
- John E. Bierwirth, president from 1941 to 1949 (who became president of the National Distillers Products Corporation).
- Charles J. Stewart, president from 1949 to 1952 (later president of the Manufacturers Hanover Trust)
- Hulbert S. Aldrich, president from 1952 to 1959.
- Alexander Stewart Webb, secretary in 1902, followed by vice president in 1904.
- James G. Blaine, vice president of the New York Trust Company (later president of the Fidelity Trust Company in 1926).
- Joseph A. Bower, vice president.
- Norman B. Ream, trustee.

== See also ==
- Corn Exchange Bank
- List of United States Supreme Court cases, volume 256
