= Hulbert Aldrich =

American banking executive and businessman

Hulbert S. Aldrich (1907–1995) was an American banking executive and businessman who had a lengthy career with the New York Trust Company and its predecessor, the Chemical Bank, serving as director of both organizations during his career. He also chaired the Commonwealth Fund Board of Directors from 1969 through 1977 and served as a board member of Hill Samuel, IBM, and Columbia University Irving Medical Center.

== Life and career ==
Aldrich, a graduate from Yale University, was born in Fall River, Massachusetts, in 1907. His older brother was the American football player Malcolm "Mac" Pratt Aldrich. In 1930, he joined the staff of the New York Trust Company (NYTC), where he was appointed vice president in 1943. He remained in that position until 1950, when he became president and director of the NYTC. His tenure as president marked several years of steady growth, and the NYTC was the ninth largest bank in New York City when it merged after nine years of his stewardship in 1959 with the city's fourth largest bank, the Chemical Corn Exchange Bank, to form the Chemical Bank New York Trust Company (CBNYTC).

Aldrich served as Vice President and director of the CBNYTC from 1959 through 1969. In 1969, the CBNYTC's holding company was formed, and Aldrich became vice chairman and director of that company. He retired from that position three years later, in 1972, after which he was elected to the board of Hill Samuel of London. He served as the chairman of Hill Samuel's New York division from 1973 through 1979.

Aldrich concurrently chaired the Commonwealth Fund Board of Directors from 1969 to 1977, a position that had previously been held by his brother Malcolm. He also served on the governing boards of several companies during his career, including IBM, Empire Savings Bank, Presbyterian Hospital, and Columbia University Irving Medical Center.

After his retirement, Aldrich divided his time between homes in Manhattan and Little Compton, Rhode Island. His last months were spent living at South Bay Manor, an assisted living facility in South Kingstown, R.I., where he died on January 2, 1995, at the age of 87.
