= E. Virgil Conway =

American lawyer

7th Chairman and CEO of the Metropolitan Transportation Authority
- In office May 18, 1995 – March 9, 2001
- Governor: George Pataki
- Preceded by: Peter Stangl
- Succeeded by: Peter Kalikow

Personal details
- Born: August 2, 1929 Southampton, New York
- Died: October 21, 2015 (aged 86) Southampton, New York
- Party: Republican
- Spouse: Elaine Wingate
- Children: Sarah, Allison
- Education: Yale Law School; Colgate University; East Hampton High School

Edmund Virgil Conway (August 2, 1929 – October 21, 2015) was an American attorney, banker, philanthropist and civic leader who was chairman and CEO of the New York State Metropolitan Transportation Authority from 1995 to 2001. He was later chairman of Rittenhouse Advisors and a member of the board of Urstadt Biddle Properties.

== Biography ==
Conway was born in Southampton, New York. Before his appointment as MTA Chairman by Governor George E. Pataki, Conway was a member of the MTA Board. He was also as a member of the New York State Thruway Authority and was on the board until his death.

Conway has been on the boards of the Union Pacific Corporation, Consolidated Edison, Atlantic Mutual Insurance Company, the mutual funds managed by the Phoenix Home Life Mutual Insurance Company, and Trism, Inc., as well as several other companies. He was chairman of the New York City Housing Partnership, chairman of the Audit Committee of the City of New York, a member of the Westchester County Industrial Development Agency, and a member of the board of trustees of Colgate University and Pace University. He also was chair of the Financial Accounting Standards Advisory Council (FASAC).

Conway has been chairman and president for Seaman's Bank for Savings, vice chairman of the New York City Partnership and Chamber of Commerce and Industry, First Deputy Superintendent of Banks of the State of New York, and chairman of the Temporary State Commission on the Water Supply Needs of Southeastern New York.

Conway grew up in Montauk, New York where his father, E. V. Conway was controller for Carl Fisher's Montauk Beach Company.

He was President of The New York Young Republican Club from 1962 to 1963.

Conway graduated magna cum laude from Colgate University in 1951, where he was elected to Phi Beta Kappa and was initiated into Phi Kappa Tau fraternity. He graduated cum laude from Yale Law School in 1956 and was also awarded an honorary Doctor of Laws from Pace University in 1990 and from Colgate University in 2002 and an honorary doctor of humane letters from the State University of New York at Stonybrook in 1998. He was an officer in the United States Air Force during the Korean War and is a retired Captain of the United States Air Force Reserve.

As a philanthropist, Conway and his wife, Elaine have funded the visitors center at the Montauk Point Lighthouse and scholarship funds at Colgate University, the Yale Law School and Pace University. On October 21, 2015, Conway died in Southampton at the age of 85.

He received the Gold Medal from The Hundred Year Association of New York in 1986 and the association's annual E. Virgil Conway College Scholarships are awarded to the sons and daughters of New York City employees every year in honor of Conway, who conceived of the scholarship program in 1971. In 1992, he assisted in the formation of the Harlem Youth Development Foundation, a scholarship program for minority youth, which he chaired for many years. He received the Ellis Island Medal of Honor in 1998 as well as honors and awards from many other charitable and educational institutions.

Preceded by Peter Stangl	Chairman of the Metropolitan Transportation Authority; 1995-2001	Succeeded by Peter Kalikow
