= Gabriel Hauge =

American economist (1914–1981)

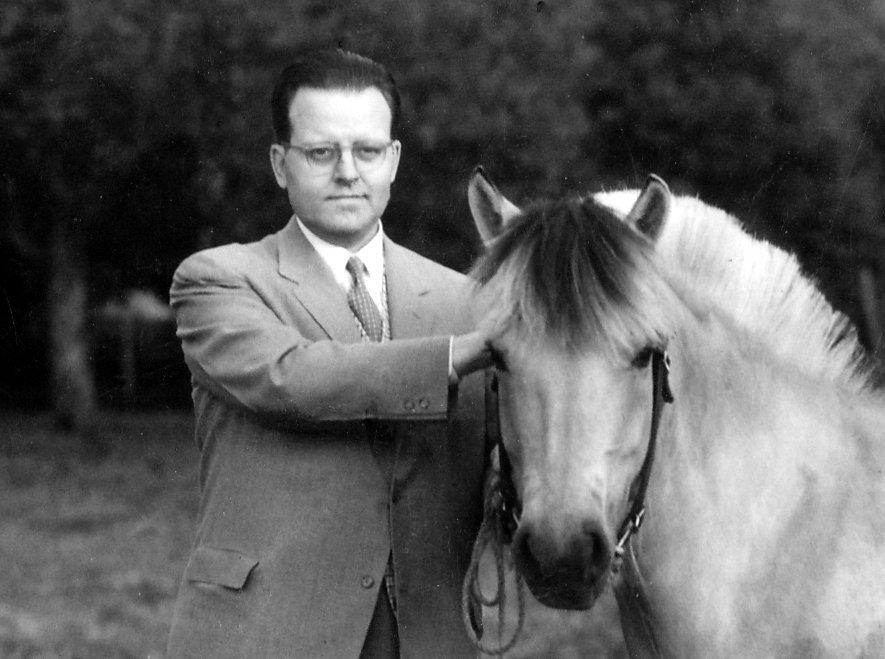
- Born: March 7, 1914; Hawley, Minnesota, U.S.
- Died: July 24, 1981 (aged 67); New York City
- Education: Concordia College; Harvard University
- Occupations: Economist, educator, author, bank executive
- Political party: Republican

Gabriel Hauge (/ˈhaʊɡi/ HOW-ghee; March 7, 1914 – July 24, 1981) was a prominent American bank executive and economist. Hauge served as assistant to the president for economic affairs during the administration of Dwight D. Eisenhower.

== Background ==
Gabriel Hauge was born in Hawley, Minnesota. He was the son of Reverend Søren G. Hauge, a Lutheran minister and an immigrant from Sandane in Sogn og Fjordane, Norway. Hauge earned a B.A. from Concordia College in 1935, an M.A. from Harvard University in 1938, and his Ph.D. from Harvard University in 1947. Gabriel married Helen Lansdowne Resor in 1948, and went on to have seven children: Ann, Stephen, John, Barbara, Susan, Elizabeth, and Caroline.

== Career ==
From 1938 to 1940, Hauge was an economics instructor at Harvard University. In 1939, he also worked at the Federal Reserve Bank of New York. From 1940 to 1942, he was a professor of economics at Princeton University. During World War II, he was an active member of the United States Navy Reserve. He served as a gunnery officer for a 5-inch battery on the USS California (BB-44) at the Battle of the Surigao Strait. From 1947 until 1950, Hauge was an economist with the New York State Banking Department. From 1950 to 1952, he was an assistant editor of Business Week magazine.

Hauge was an economic advisor to the 1948 presidential campaign of Thomas Dewey. During the 1952 presidential campaign, he was on Dwight D. Eisenhower's campaign staff as a research director for Citizens for Eisenhower. Following the presidential election of 1952, Hauge served as assistant to the president for economic affairs from 1953 to 1958.

In 1958, Hauge joined Manufacturers Trust Company. In 1961, Manufacturers Trust Company merged with Central Hanover Bank & Trust Company (Hanover Trust). From 1964 until 1981, Hauge served as a director of the Council on Foreign Relations. In 1970, he became chairman of the Board of Directors of Manufacturers Hanover Trust Company. He was a member of the steering committee of the Bilderberg Group.

== Selected works ==
- Freedom and the Economic Role of Government (1957)
- The U.S. Economy: Problems and Promise (1960)
- Is the Individual Obsolete? (Benjamin F. Fairless memorial lectures) (1964)
- The International Capital Market and the International Monetary System (1978)
