= Banca Commerciale Italiana Trust Co. =

Banca Commerciale Italiana Trust Co. of New York
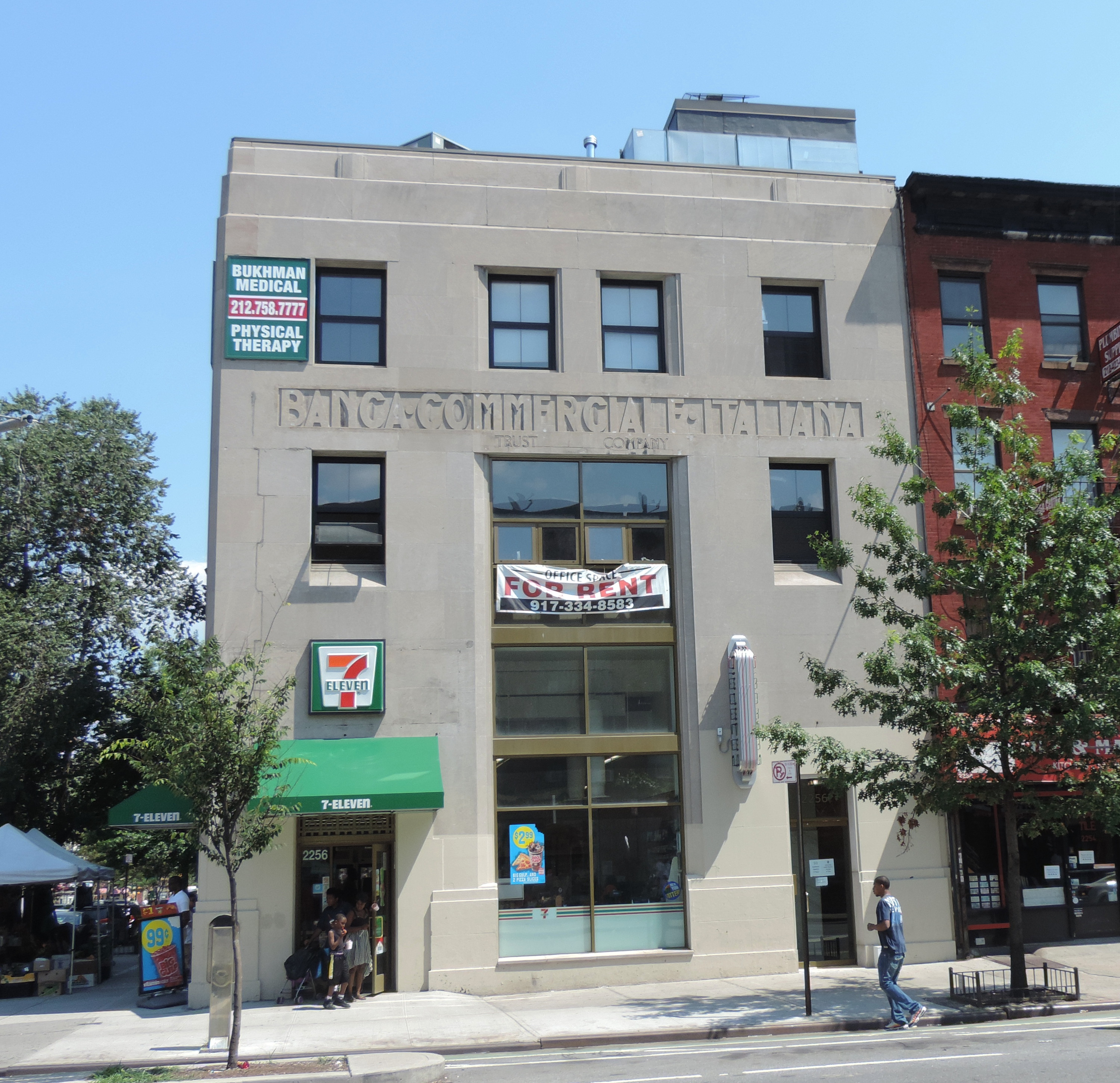
- East Harlem branch
- Founded: 1924; 101 years ago in New York City, New York
- Founder: Banca Commerciale Italiana
- Defunct: 1939; 86 years ago

Banca Commerciale Italiana (BCI) established Banca Commerciale Italiana Trust Co. of New York (BCITNY) in 1924 and closed it in 1939, in the run-up to World War II.

In 1917 Lodovico Toeplitz, chief of the Foreign Department of BCI, visited New York. In January 1918 BCI established an agency in New York on Broadway. The bank's aim was to finance imports to the US from Italy, to fund acceptance credits, and to gather the deposits of Italian migrants to the US. At the time, BCI was Italy's largest bank, and the main institution financing industry in northern Italy.

In 1921 the bank transferred its agency to a building on Williams Street that BCI had bought.

In 1913 or 1914, BCI had taken an equity interest in Lincoln Trust Co., of New York. BCI sold its interest in 1922.

In 1924, following changes in US regulations, BCI decided to open a US subsidiary, Banca Commerciale Italiana Trust Co. of New York, in order to be able to continue to gather deposits. The president of BCITNY also directed BCI's New York agency in order to ensure that the two operations cooperated closely.

Four years later, in March to June 1928, Giuseppe Toeplitz came to New York to oversee the opening of Bancomit Corp., which BCI established better to operate in US real estate markets. In time, BCIT came to have branches on 6th Avenue and Mulberry Street, and in Harlem, South Brooklyn, and Long Island City. The branches served areas heavily populated by Italian emigrant communities.

Lastly, BCITNY helped Italian industrial enterprises including Montecatini - Società Generale per l'Industria Mineraria e Chimica, La Società Generale Elettrica dell'Adamello (the Adamello Electricity Company), Unione esercizi elettrici (United Electric Service Company), Società lombarda per distribuzione di energia elettrica (Lombard Electricity Distribution Company) and others, access US loan markets.

In 1928, BCIT was the underwriter of a bond issue in New York for Italian Superpower Corporation. Siro Fusi, the president of BCIT, was also a vice president of Italian Superpower. Fusi represented other Italian business interests in the United States, and served on the board of other the American Chatillon Corporation, a subsidiary of Milan's La Soie de Châtillon.

In 1929 BCI established two more subsidiaries, Banca Commerciale Italiana Trust Co. of Boston (est. 15 January 1929), and Banca Commerciale Italiana Trust Co. of Philadelphia. When BCIT opened in Philadelphia it was the only foreign bank in that city. In the 1930s it became a member of the Federal Deposit Insurance Corporation.

In 1933 the Italian immigrant bank Banca Stabile merged into the Banca Commerciale Italiana Trust Co.

In 1933, Adolfo Rossi of BCI traveled to New York to implement a reorganization of BCI's operations in North America. In late 1934 the bank received US$15,000 in gold from South American mines. The producers apparently found it profitable to ship the gold to New York to sell it to the US Government.

In 1937 BCI liquidated the Boston operation. In 1938 it closed the Philadelphia operation after selling the business to Liberty Title & Trust Co.

In February 1939, BCI liquidated BCITNY and transferred its assets to Manufacturers Trust Co. of New York. Two years later, after the US declared war on Italy on 11 December 1941, the United States Federal Reserve sequestrated and liquidated the assets of BCI's agency in the US. BCI would not return to New York until 6 March 1969 when it opened a branch there.
