= Charles Jacob Stewart =

American businessman (1898–1987)

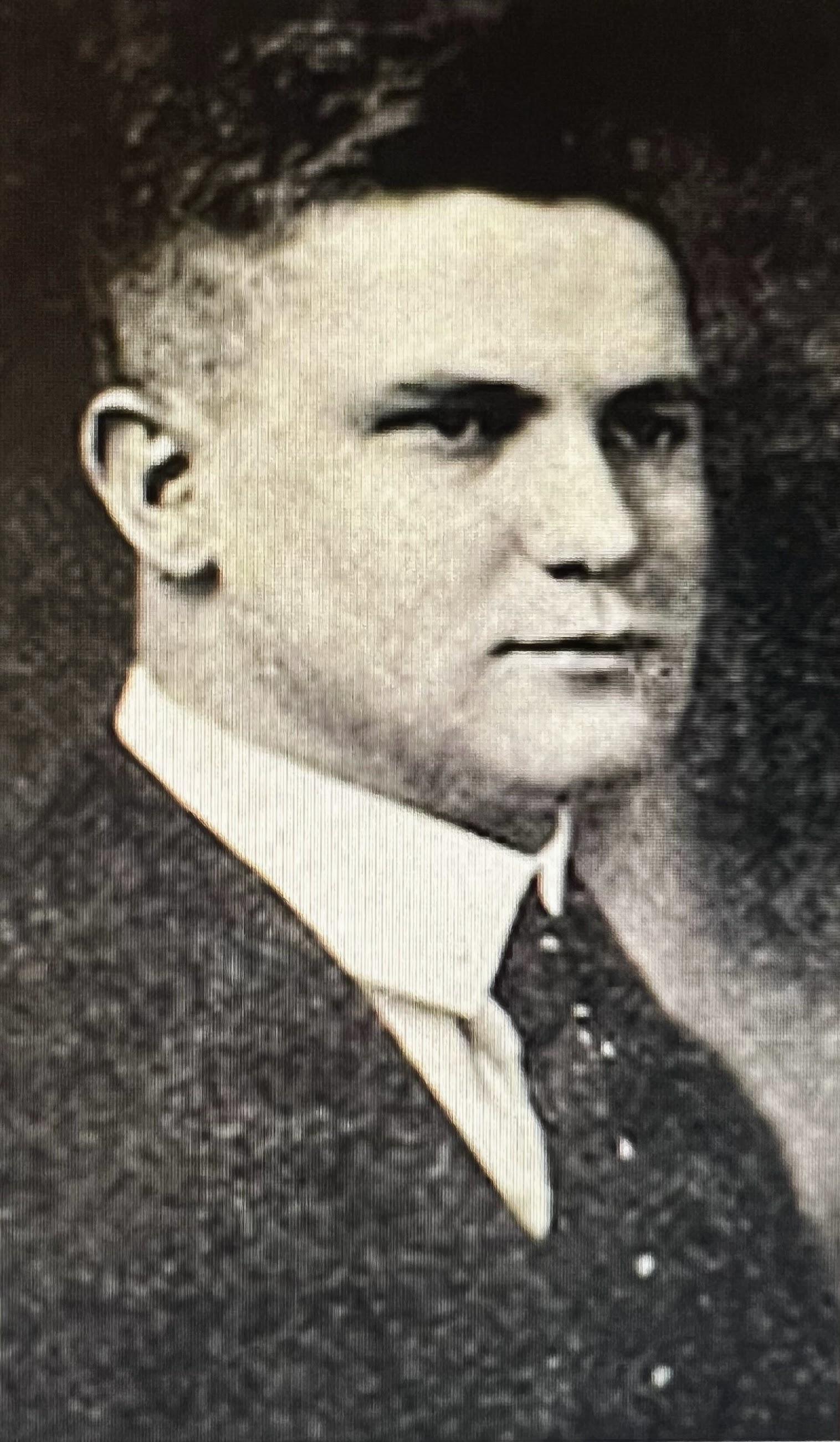
- c. 1918

Personal details
- Born: June 3, 1898 Dallas, Texas, US
- Died: July 14, 1987 (aged 89) Naples, Florida, US
- Resting place: Grove Hill Memorial Park, Dallas, Texas
- Spouses: Maude Emily Tenison Stewart (died 1966); Clothilde Stewart
- Children: 2
- Parent(s): Robert Henry Stewart (1854-1936), Ada Rauch Stewart (1860-1952)
- Education: Yale University
- Occupation: Bank Executive

Military service
- Allegiance: United States
- Branch/service: United States Army
- Rank: Second Lieutenant
- Battles/wars: World War I

Charles J Stewart (June 3, 1898 – July 14, 1987) was a banking executive and the first chairman of Manufacturers Hanover Trust Company.

== Early life ==
Born in 1898, Stewart was raised in Dallas, Texas, on Swiss Avenue and graduated from the Terrill School for Boys in 1914. At the age of 16 he went to Yale University, where he was a running back on the varsity football team for three years. He captained the Yale's 1917 football team and graduated in 1918. While at Yale, Charles was tapped by Henry Fenimore Cooper (1895-1984) for Skull and Bones secret society. Other members in the society at this time included Prescott Bush and Charles Phelps Taft II. Upon graduation, he enlisted in the U.S. Army and served as a second lieutenant in World War I.

After Yale, Stewart served as a second lieutenant in the artillery in World War I.

Stewart is the grandson of Dr. Charles B Stewart (1806-1885) a political leader in the State of Texas who is purported to have designed the Texas state flag and seal.

== Career ==
=== New York Trust Company ===
Stewart returned to Dallas after the war and began a real estate career. He joined the commercial banking department of the New York Trust Company in 1930 and advanced through the offices of assistant vice president, vice president and trustee. By 1949, he was president of the company.

In 1952, Stewart led the proposed merger of New York Trust Company with Manufacturers Trust Company. That merger was stymied by his own stockholders, and Stewart resigned to become a general partner at Lazard Frères, an investment bank.

=== Lazard Frères & Co ===
Stewart was a general partner at Lazard Frères investment bank from 1953 to 1959.

Stewart was appointed as a director of Loew's, Inc in February 1956. He resigned this directorship without explanation shortly thereafter.

=== Manufacturers Trust Company ===
In October 1961, Manufacturers Trust Company merged with Hanover Bank, and Stewart became president of Manufacturers Hanover Trust at the age of 61. The merger became the nation's fourth largest commercial bank. Elected chair, he served in that capacity until his retirement in 1963.

In 1981, after Stewart's retirement, Manufacturers Hanover Trust would move its offices from 350 to 270 Park Avenue, and after his death merge into Chemical Banking Corporation whose predecessor had acquired his former employer New York Trust in 1959. Chemical Banking ultimately evolved into J.P. Morgan Chase & Co, whose offices are still at 270 Park Avenue to this day.

=== Other ===
Stewart was a director of the Pennsylvania Dixie Cement Corporation, the Illinois Zinc Company, the Discount Corporation of New York and the Safe Deposit Company. He was Manhattan chairman and director of the Greater New York Fund from 1944 to 1949 and has served as a director of the United Service Organizations.

== Personal life ==
Stewart married Maud Emily Stewart (née Tenison) of Dallas, Texas (1900-1966). Maud Emily was a graduate of The Hockaday School in the first graduating class of 1916 and later became the first president of the Hockaday Alumnae Association. She was an Idlewild Debutante in 1916, and attended Finch College. Together they had one son Charles "Charlie" Jacob Stewart Jr. (1926-1981) and one daughter Emily Tenison Stewart Goyer (1923-1989).

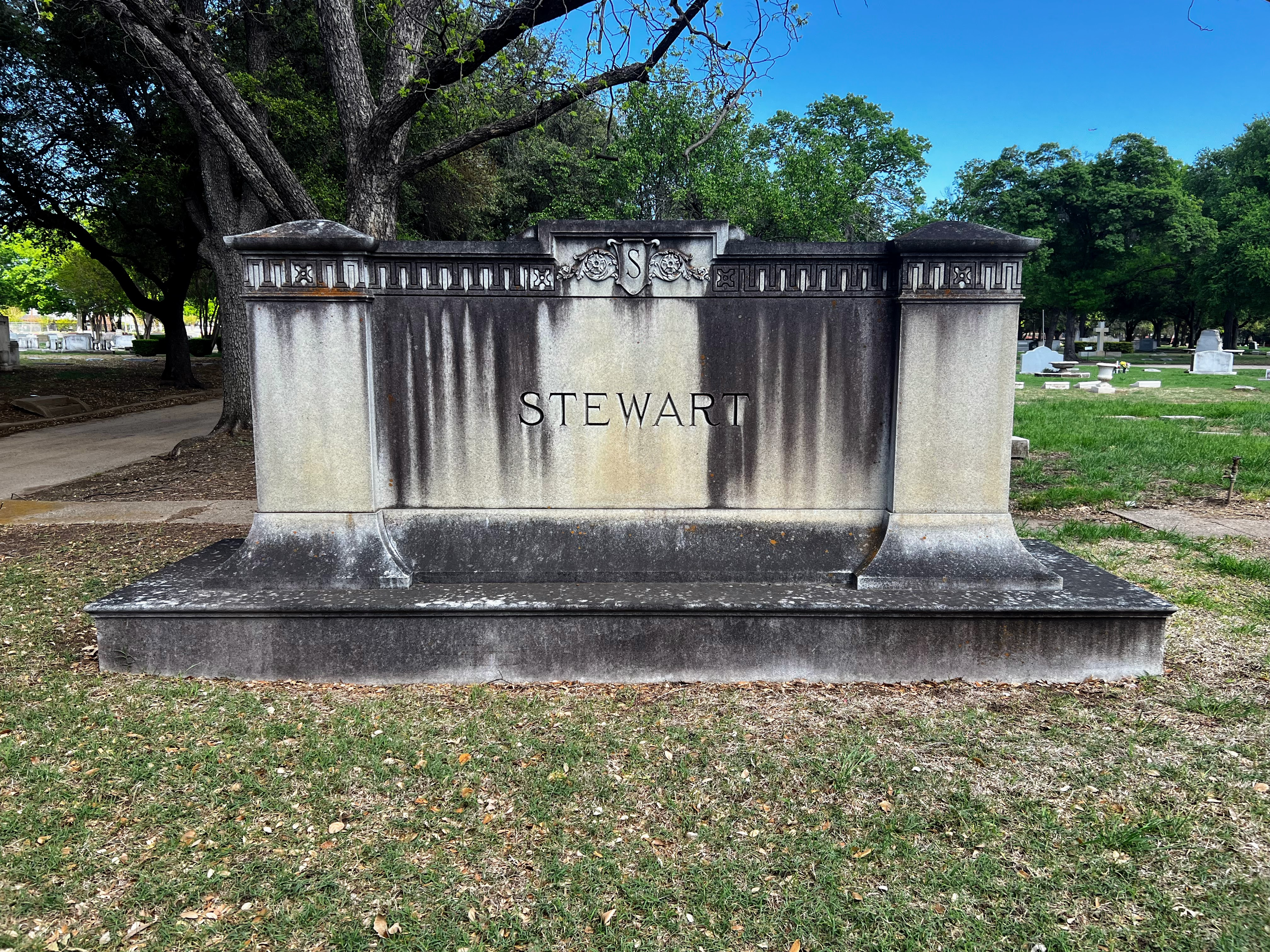
Stewart Memorial circa 2023

In 1940, accordingly to census records, Stewart lived at 25 Ridgecroft Road, Bronxville, New York. The records list his wife (39), daughter (16), son (13) and butler Anastasio Esealdeia (34). At this time Stewart is listed as vice president at a Commercial Bank.

In 1948 Stewart published an engagement announcement in The Bronxville Review-Press for his daughter's engagement. At the time the Stewart lived at 10 Beechwood Road, Bronxville, New York.

Stewart's daughter, Emily Tenison Stewart Goyer, is a graduate of The Masters School, Vassar College, and received her master's degree from the Institute of Fine Art, New York University, in 1948. She married Charles Wesley Goyer and had a son and a daughter.

After Maud Emily's passing, Stewart met and married Clothilde de Veze. At the age of 89, he died of cardiac failure at his home in Naples, Florida. Three years after Stewart's passing, Clothide married Marvin Bower.

He is buried in the Grove Hill Memorial Park in Dallas, Texas.
