= Thomas S. Johnson =

American banker

Thomas S. Johnson is an American banker. He was chairman and CEO of GreenPoint Financial Corp. and GreenPoint Bank from 1993 to 2004. He chaired the Board of Trustees of the United States-Japan Foundation from April 23, 2001 to 2013. He was president and director of Manufacturers Hanover Trust Co. and Manufacturers Hanover Corporation from 1989 to 1991. In the first quarter of 2009 he was named as non-executive chairman of the board at The Phoenix Companies after serving on the board since 2000. Phoenix is based in Hartford, Connecticut (NYSE: PNX).

Johnson graduated from Harvard in 1964 and started the Master of Business Management Program at Ateneo de Manila University.
