= Samuel D. Leidesdorf =

American accountant (1881–1968)

- Born: September 25, 1881; New York City
- Died: August 21, 1968 (aged 86)
- Occupation: Accountant philanthropist
- Board member of: American Jewish Committee, New York University Medical Center

Samuel David Leidesdorf (1881-1968) was an American accountant who was posthumously inducted into the CPA Hall of Fame.

== Biography ==
Leidesdorf was born on September 25, 1881, in New York City. He attended the New York School of Accounting and Pace College. In 1905, he began his own accounting firm, S.D. Leidesdorf & Co., certified public accountants, which grew and eventually became one of the largest accounting firms in the nation. The 1915 New York City Directory shows him living at 302 West 79th and with the S.D. Leidesdorf Co office at 417 5th Avenue. His World War I Draft Registration Card shows he had moved to 309 W 86th. In 1929, he helped arrange the sale of Newark-based Bamberger's department store, to the R.H. Macy Co. Fortune recognized his company as a “Pioneering Firm” in 1932.

In 1931 he was on the executive committee of the American Jewish Committee. He served on the State Council of Accountancy, from 1934 to 1942. When Albert Einstein arrived in the US, Leidesdorf was his accountant. He soon began dedicating himself to what would become a lifetime of philanthropic endeavors for medical and educational institutions, and many other charitable causes, including the Red Cross, the United Jewish Appeal, the Young Women's Christian Association and the United Negro College Fund. "In a letter written to Mr. S. D. Leidesdorf of New York, Rockefeller solicited Leidesdorf to serve as a member of the Foundation Committee of the UNCF, working with W. D. Embree, the Chairman."

Leidesdorf was active in civic and community service and received numerous honors and awards, including an honorary degree as doctor of humane letters from Hebrew Union College, the Medal of the National Fund for Medical Education, the Herbert H. Lehman Human Relations Award of the American Jewish Committee and the Medal for Distinguished Service from the Protestant Council of the City of New York. In 1958, Leidesdorf received The Hundred Year Association of New York's Gold Medal Award "in recognition of outstanding contributions to the City of New York." He was a founding Trustee for the Institute for Advanced Study.

In 1948, Leidesdorf began his tenure on the board of the New York University Medical Center serving as the first Chair of the Building Committee. Later he served as the Chair of the board from 1956 until his death on September 21, 1968.

He was chairman of the board of NYU Medical Center from 1956 to 1968. At the time of his death in 1968, the firm he founded was in the top 10 of accounting firms in the United States. The company he started merged to become Ernst & Whinney in 1979 and Ernst and Young in 1989.

With his wife Elsa Grunwald, he had two children Helen and Arthur (1918–91).

== Resources ==
- Hall of Fame induction
- Street named for him
- Leidesdorf Club
- IAS site
- Picture
- 1930 US Federal Census
- Social Security Death Index
- OneWorldTree
- World War I Draft Registration Card, published by ancestry.com
