= Banca Stabile =

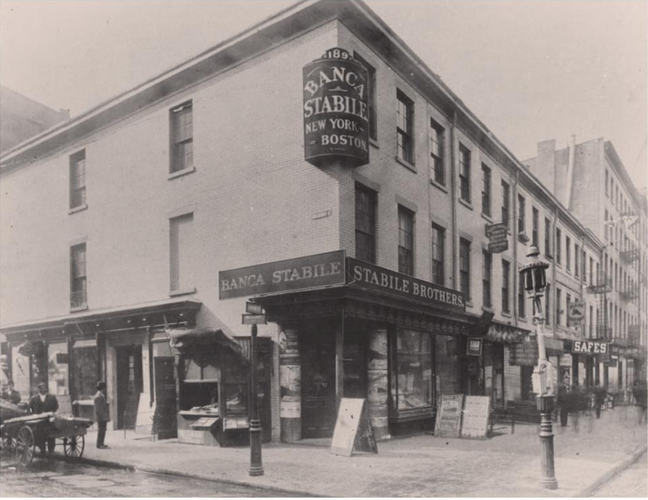
- The Banca Stabile building in the early 1900s.
- Founded: 1885; 140 years ago in New York City, New York
- Founder: Francesco Rosario Stabile
- Defunct: 1933; 92 years ago

The Banca Stabile was established in 1885 on the corner of 189 Grand Street and 155 Mulberry Street in Manhattan's Little Italy, New York City, by Francesco Rosario Stabile. As of October 2008 the building became the home of the Italian American Museum (IAM).

== History ==
The bank was founded by Francesco Rosario Stabile (1845-1920) who arrived in New York City in 1865 from the province of Salerno in Italy. At the time, he was a 20-years-old veteran of the Italian unification struggles. In the 1870s he founded a bank in a shop at 74 Mulberry Street, in the burgeoning Italian immigrant community, and in 1885 moved to a larger building on the corner of Grand and Mulberry streets.

The Banca Stabile was one of the many Italian immigrant banks in Mulberry Street, that was also known as the Italian Wall Street, that proliferated before stricter banking regulations were introduced.

The bank offered the Italian immigrants more than just financial services. Many immigrants preferred to do their banking with people who spoke their language. The bank was one of the many small banks available to Italian immigrants around Little Italy and was a link with their relatives in Italy. In addition to a full range of banking services, it also provided the many other services, such as a telegraph and post office, passenger ship ticketing, import-export services, translation and public notary; in short the enterprise in fact acted as an all-in-one Italian immigrant service center.

The Stabile brothers, Francesco Rosario and Gabriele Stabile, also opened a branch in Boston on North Square in the North End, the city's Italian quarter.

With the emancipation of second- and third-generation of Italian Americans the bank started to lose its function for the community. When the banking crisis of the Great Depression got worse in 1932 the New York State government closed the bank. In 1933 the bank merged with Banca Commerciale Italiana Trust Co.

== Italian American Museum ==
The Stabile family continued with a passenger ship ticketing agency until 1965, and used the building on the corner of Grand and Mulberry streets to run its real estate business. The family kept the characteristic interior intact, including its vault, tin ceiling, marble floor and counters, bronze grilles, and teller cages intact. The family sold the building to the Italian American Museum in June 2008 for more than $9 million.

== Sources ==
- Aleandri, Emelise (2002). Little Italy. Charleston NC: Arcadia Publishing. ISBN 0-7385-1062-9.
- Jaffe, Steven H.; Lautin, Jessica (2014). Capital of Capital: Money, Banking, and Power in New York City, 1784-2012. New York City: Museum of the City of New York. ISBN 9780231537711.
- Nevis, Michelle; Nevis, James (2009). Inside the Apple: A Streetwise History of New York City. New York City: Free Press. ISBN 9781416593935.
- Price, Michael; Sammarco, Anthony Mitchell (2000). Boston's Immigrants 1840-1925. Charleston NC: Arcadia Publishing. ISBN 978-0-7385-5675-8.
