= Money center bank =

Very large commercial bank playing major role in key financial center

A money center bank (also written money-center bank) is a bank or bank holding company that is a particular kind of high-end commercial bank: located in a major financial center such as New York or San Francisco, its lending operations are financed by borrowings from other banks or by issuing bonds. Money center banks tend to engage in a number of different or related businesses, such as corporate banking, investment banking, foreign exchange services, currency trading, securities trading, derivatives trading, issuing credit cards, and making loans to private equity firms and to foreign governments. Money center banks have extremely large balance sheets, and are large enough and embedded enough within international finance that they are often considered to be in the "too big to fail" category.

Being a money center bank does not have a firm definition, and in some cases, observers may disagree on exactly where the boundary is between money center banks and very large regional banks. As a general tendency, money center banks get more of their funds via money markets compared to getting funds from the deposit accounts of consumers. While money center banks can and do accept deposits from consumers and otherwise behave like a retail bank in certain of their locations, that is not their major source of income. There is some overlap between the idea of a money center bank and that of a universal bank.

The term 'money center bank' seems to have first started gaining appearances in the 1960s and 1970s although the phrase has been found occurring earlier. According to one breakdown, during the 1980s there were as many as eleven money center banks in the United States.

As of 2024, the prime examples of American money center banks are JPMorgan Chase and Citigroup. Two others are often included as well, Bank of America and Wells Fargo. Some ancestor companies of these were considered, in their time, as money center banks; in the case of JPMorgan Chase, these include Manufacturers Hanover Corporation and Chemical Banking Corporation, as well as the denoted Chase Manhattan Bank and J.P. Morgan & Co.

Besides their headquarters, money center banks have offices in major financial centers around the world, such as in London and Hong Kong. Money center banks can be foreign-owned, for instance Bankers Trust has been owned by Deutsche Bank and HSBC Bank USA by HSBC.

== See also ==
- List of systemically important banks
