= Harvey Dow Gibson =

American businessman (1882–1950)

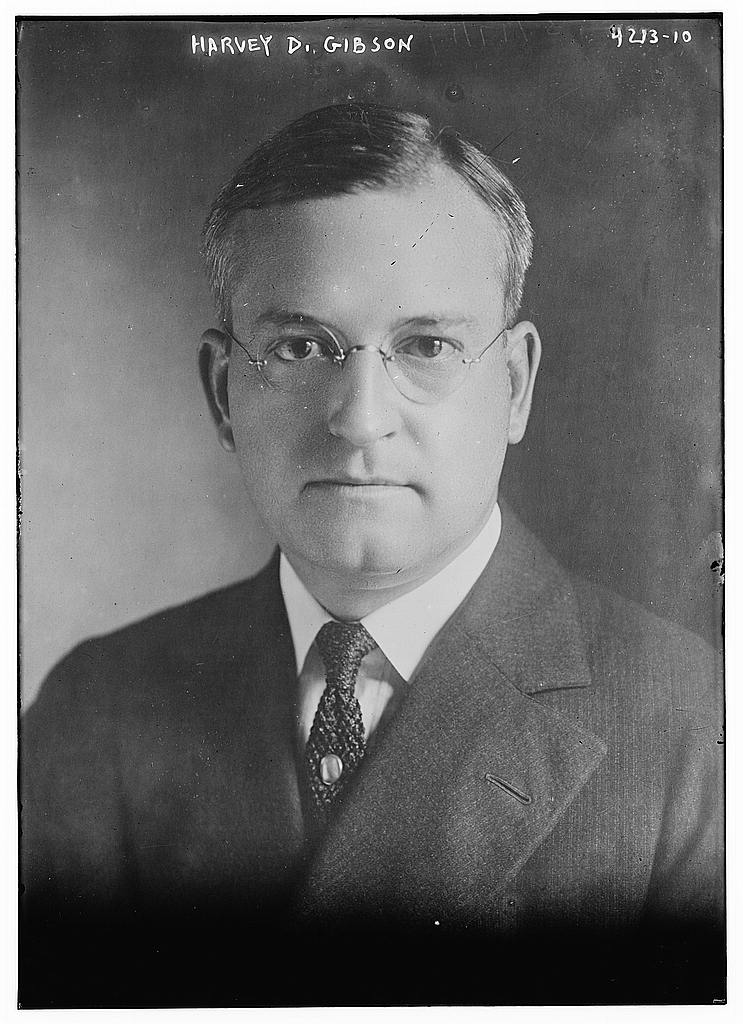
Harvey Dow Gibson in 1917

Harvey Dow Gibson (March 12, 1882 – September 11, 1950) was an American businessman.

== Early life ==
Harvey Dow Gibson was born on March 12, 1882, at North Conway in Carroll County, New Hampshire. He was the son of James Lewis Gibson (1855–1933) and Addie ([née-en] Dow) Gibson (1854–1934). His father was telegraph operator for the Portland & Ogdensburg Railroad.

He attended Fryeburg Academy, graduating in 1898. From Fryeburg, he went on to Bowdoin College in Brunswick, Maine, graduating in 1902.

== Career ==
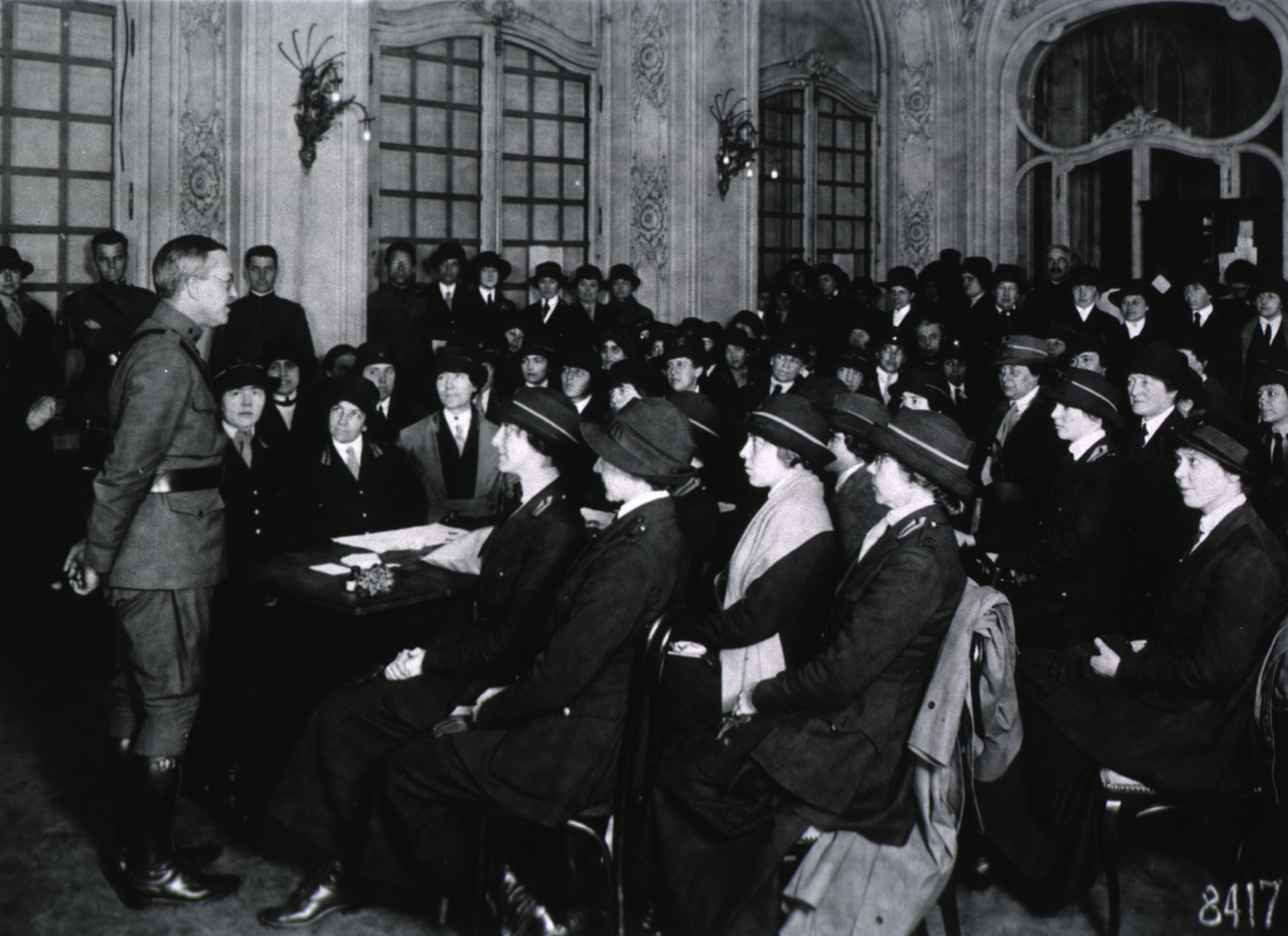
Gibson addressing a group of Red Cross nurses in France during World War 2

Gibson began his career with the American Express Company, then later with Liberty National Bank, where he became president in 1916. As a result of the merger between Liberty National Bank and New York Trust Company, he became president of the latter. In December, 1930, as part of a plan by the New York Clearing House and the Federal Reserve Bank of New York to stem bank runs, Gibson headed a group of investors which purchased the controlling interest in the Manufacturers Trust Company from Goldman Sachs, and he became president of the bank on January 5, 1931. In 1931, Gibson received The Hundred Year Association of New York's Gold Medal Award "in recognition of outstanding contributions to the City of New York."

Gibson was active with the American Red Cross, serving as its Commissioner in France during World War I, and as Commissioner to Great Britain during World War II.

=== Other interests ===
He founded the Cranmore Mountain Resort in 1937, importing Austrian ski instructor Hannes Schneider to teach guests how to ski. He bought the Eastern Slope Inn in the same year, and served on the executive board of the New York World's Fair in 1939 and 1940.

== Personal life ==
On June 10, 1903, Gibson was married to Carrie Hastings Curtis. After their divorce in 1925, he married Helen Cole (née Whitney) Bourne (1890–1974), the former wife of George Galt Bourne, on March 12, 1926.

He died on September 11, 1950, in Boston, Massachusetts. He was buried at North Conway Cemetery in North Conway, New Hampshire.
