= Manufacturers Hanover Corporation =

Former bank holding company

- The 1986–1991 logo was in use until its merger with Chemical Bank; Chemical continued its usage until its merger with Chase.
- Trade name: Manufacturers Hanover Trust Company
- Type: Public
- Traded as: NYSE: MHC
- Industry: Bank holding company
- Founded: 1853; 173 years ago (as Mechanics' Bank of Williamsburgh); September 8, 1961; 65 years ago (as Manufacturers Hanover Trust)
- Defunct: December 31, 1991; 34 years ago
- Fate: Acquired by Chemical Bank and assumed the name Chemical after the 1991 merger.
- Successor: Chemical Bank
- Headquarters: New York City
- Key people: Charles J. Stewart; Robert E. McNeill Jr.; Gabriel Hauge; John F. McGillicuddy
- Products: Financial services
- Total assets: $61.3 billion (1991)
- Number of employees: 19,721 (1990)

Manufacturers Hanover Corporation was an American bank holding company that was formed as the parent of Manufacturers Hanover Trust Company (MHT or, informally, Manny Hanny), a large New York City bank formed through a merger in 1961 with ancestor companies, especially the Manufacturers Trust Company, having had a long history in New York banking going back to the 1850s. After 1969, Manufacturers Hanover Trust became a subsidiary of Manufacturers Hanover Corporation. Throughout most of its existence, Manufacturers Hanover Trust was the fourth-largest bank in the United States.

MHT was both a major money center bank and heavily engaged in retail banking. As such, the bank was known for stability and was well established via its personal accounts base tied to New York branch locations as well as having a number of large blue-chip corporate customers. It ran several memorable advertising campaigns in the 1970s and also had some prominent sports sponsorship arrangements. Over time it gained substantial operations in other parts of the United States as well as overseas.

But by the late 1980s, Manufacturers Hanover had fallen in rank among American banks and was troubled by several bad loans, especially ones in Latin America. In 1991 it merged into Chemical Banking Corporation and within a couple of years had disappeared under its name. However it continued to have an influence via some of its executives, internal systems, and its presence at 270 Park Avenue, where successor corporations down to JPMorgan Chase continued to locate their headquarters.

== Ancestor history of Manufacturers Trust Company ==
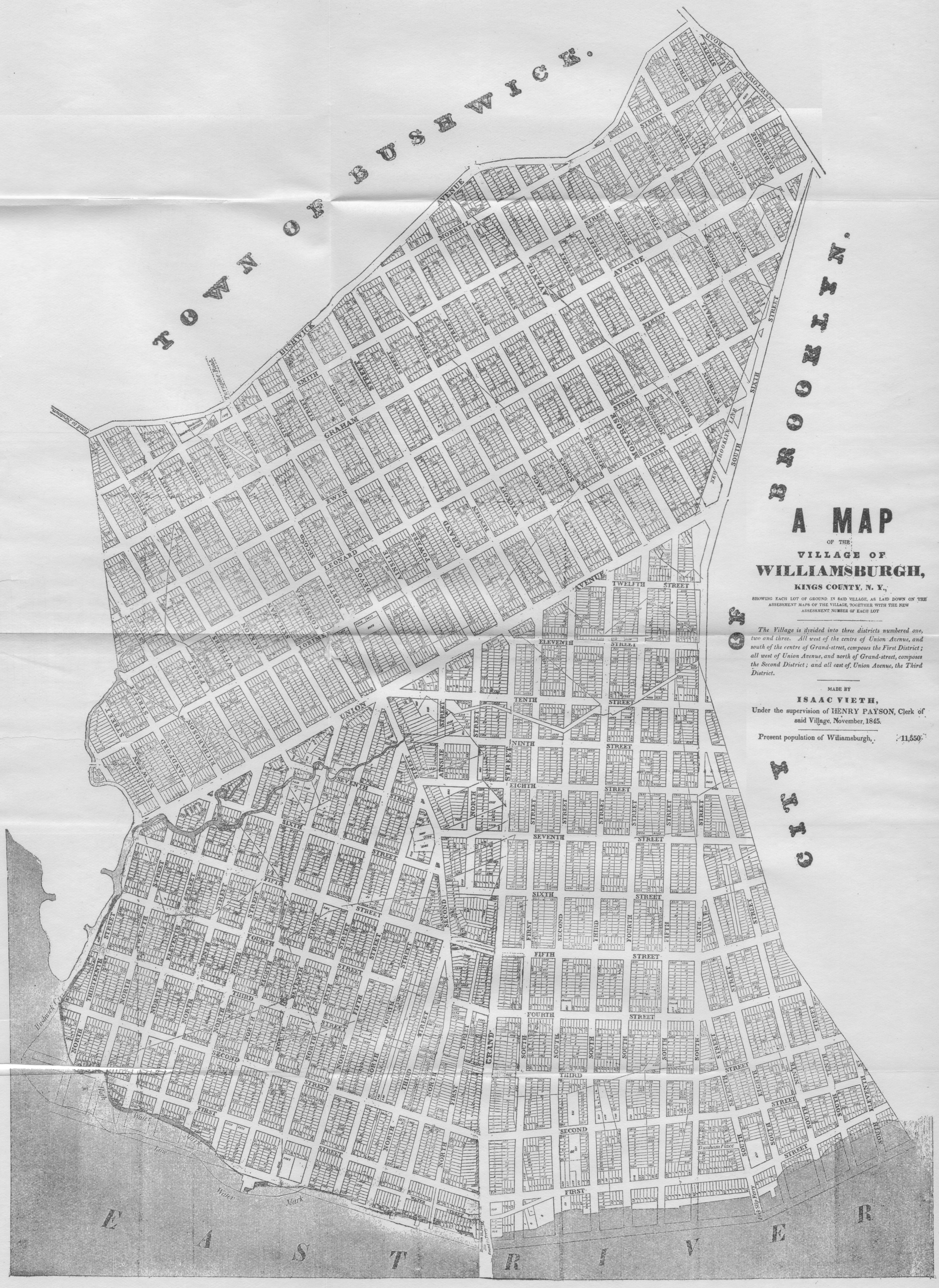
Williamsburgh, 1845 (map oriented with West at top). The origins of Manufacturers Trust began on these streets.

The roots of Manufacturers Hanover have been traced as far back as 1812, when the New York Manufacturing Co. was founded with a charter that included banking authority.

Commonly, however, the history of the Manufacturers Trust line is considered to have started in 1853. That is when the Mechanics' Bank of Williamsburgh was created, in what was then the City of Williamsburgh, a couple of years before its incorporation into Brooklyn. It mainly serviced business customers in the Second Ward of Williamsburgh, and was considered small in size. According to one account in the Brooklyn Daily Eagle, the bank's directors were ex-officials of Williamsburgh.

In 1858, the bank changed its name to the Manufacturers' Bank of Brooklyn. Then in 1865, it changed from being a state-chartered bank to a national bank, moved its offices to Lower Manhattan, and took the name Manufacturers National Bank of New York. But the year 1867 saw it foundering financially, and it soon returned to Brooklyn. It took the name Manufacturers National Bank of Brooklyn in 1868, which name it kept into the twentieth century.

Meanwhile, the Citizens Trust Company of Brooklyn had been formed in 1905. Citizens Trust's first acquisition came with its merger with the Broadway Bank of Brooklyn in 1912. Then in 1914, the Manufacturers National Bank and the Citizens Trust Company merged to become the Manufacturers-Citizens Trust Company, with directors and officers of both banks having similar positions in the new entity and the resulting combination becoming the largest bank in the Eastern District of Brooklyn. Some sources view Citizens Trust as the surviving company in this merger, which leads them to trace the Manufacturers Trust line back only to 1905, while others, as previously stated, consider the line to extend back to 1853.

In any case, the new entity had its headquarters at the 774–776 address on Broadway (Brooklyn). The following year, the merged bank's name was simplified to the Manufacturers Trust Company. (Coincidentally, Manufacturers Trust Company had also been the name of a different Brooklyn-based bank, founded in 1896 and acquired in 1902 by the Title Guarantee and Trust Company, also located in Brooklyn.) It would stay under the Manufacturers Trust Company name for the next forty-six years.

== Manufacturers Trust Company ==
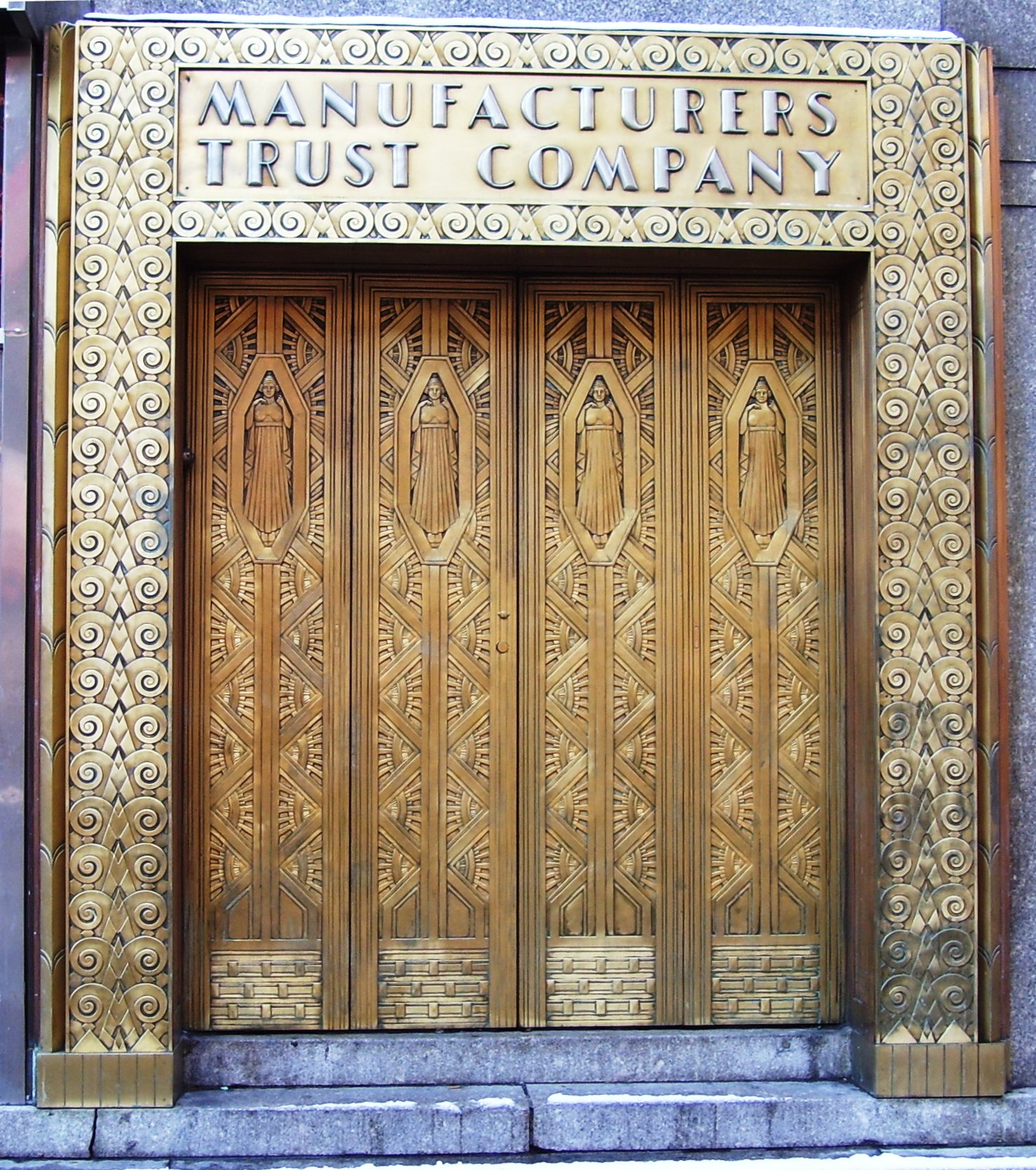
A bronze doorway in the New Yorker Hotel in midtown Manhattan that formerly led to a branch of the Manufacturers Trust Company

The head of Manufacturers Trust Company was the noted banker and philanthropist Nathan S. Jonas, who had come over from Citizens Trust. Jonas put into place an ambitious strategy towards expansion, and through various mergers with banks throughout New York City, it became a growing commercial bank. To begin with, Manufacturers Trust acquired a Manhattan presence with its acquisition of the West Side Bank of New York in 1918. Later Manufacturers Trust acquired the Ridgewood National Bank of Queens (1921), the North Side Bank of Brooklyn (1922), the Industrial Savings Bank (1922), and the Columbia Bank of New York (1923). By the time it absorbed the Yorkville Bank of New York in 1925, Manufacturers Trust had become the 29th largest bank in the United States. Having accomplished one of the quickest expansions seen, it also ranked as one of the largest banks within New York City.

Acquisitions continued apace. Jonas retired from the bank in 1931, having, according to one account, gained the reputation as "the man who humanized banking." By now the bank's headquarters offices were at the original 55 Broad Street location in Manhattan's Financial District.

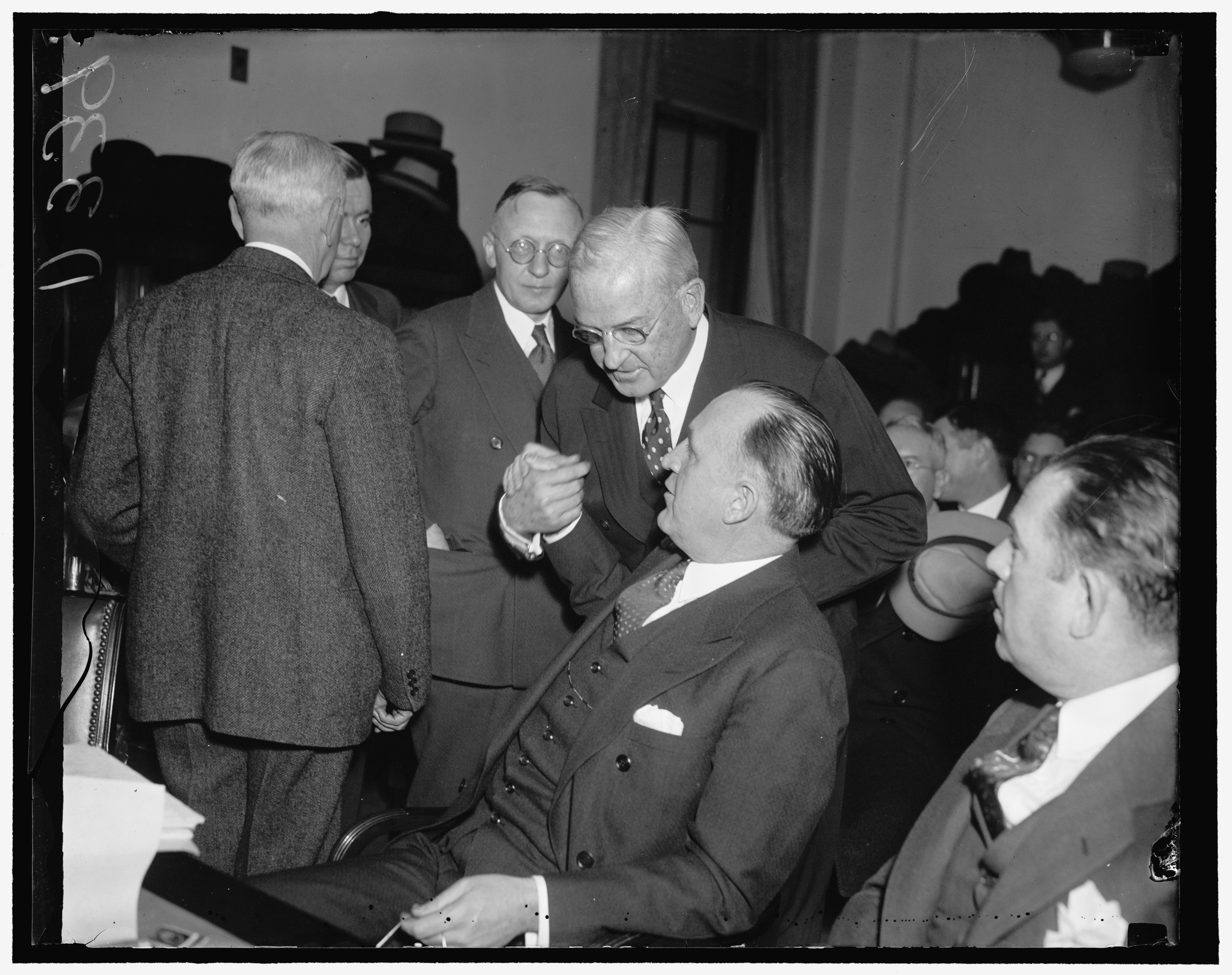
Harvey D. Gibson (center, leaning over), President of the Manufacturers Trust Company, at a 1936 U.S. Senate hearing

However, in 1931, during the Great Depression, Manufacturers Trust was being subjected to serious bank runs, which led to Harvey D. Gibson being named president of the bank, a position he would hold for the next two decades. Working with banking officials at both the national and state levels, Gibson stabilized Manufacturers Trust and then led it in the following year in acquiring the large but financially troubled Chatham Phenix National Bank and Trust Company of New York.

In 1932, Manufacturers Trust created the National Hotel Management Company (NMH) to centrally oversee the hotels the bank held mortgages on. They appointed hotel pioneer Ralph Hitz as president of the NMH. His appointment was because, even at the height of the Great Depression, Hitz had been able to turn a profit at the New Yorker Hotel, which the Manufacturers Trust also held the mortgage for. By 1940, the NHM had become the largest hotel organization in the United States. It managed the New Yorker, the Lexington, and the Belmont Plaza hotels (New York); the Congress Hotel (Chicago); the Netherland Plaza (Cincinnati); the Adolphus Hotel (Dallas); the Van Cleve (Dayton); the Book-Cadillac (Detroit); the Nicollet Hotel (Minneapolis); the New York Municipal Airport Restaurants (New York); and the Eastern Slope Inn (North Conway, New Hampshire). The National Hotel Management Company was dissolved within a month of Hitz's death in 1940.

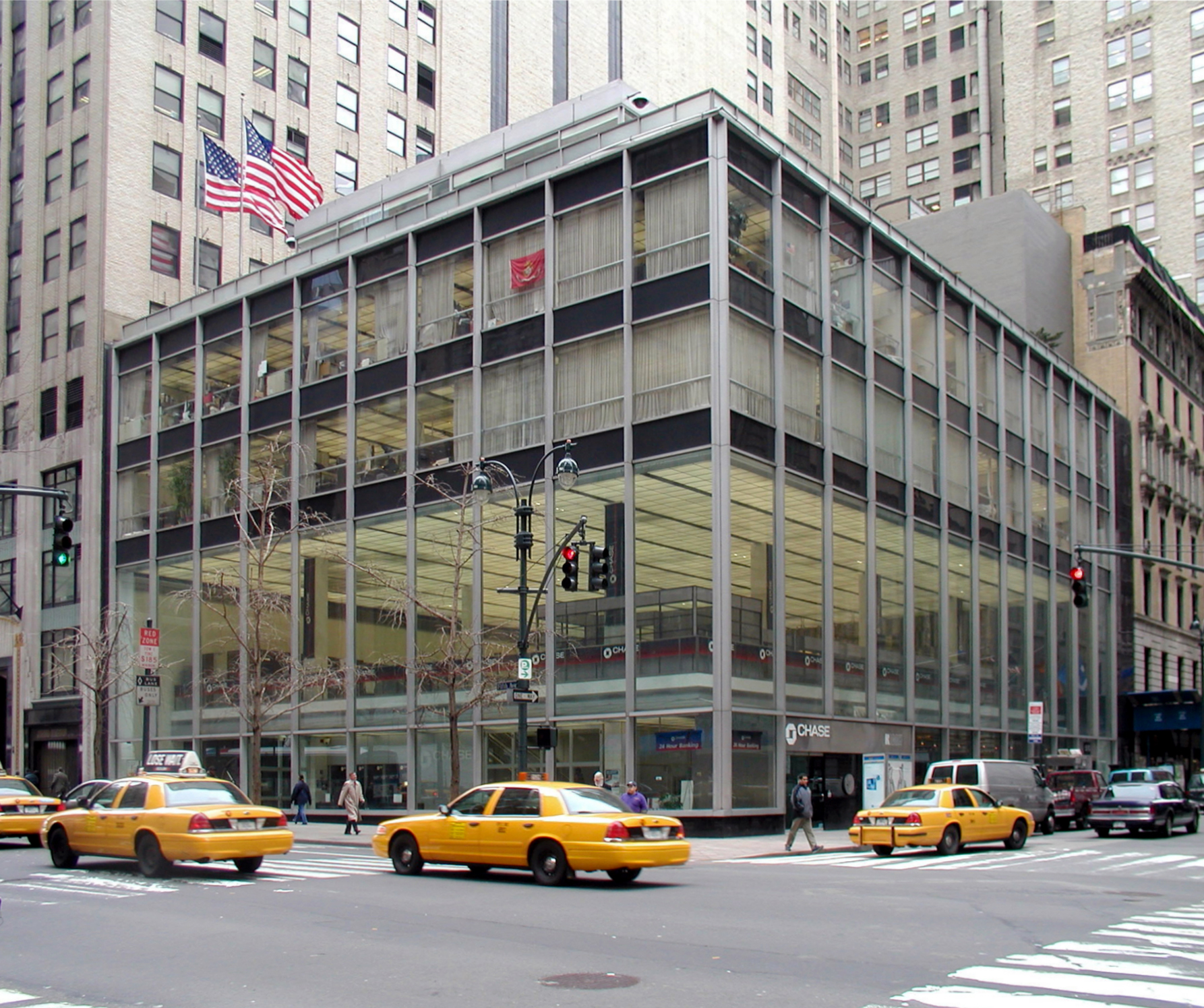
The Manufacturers Trust Company Building, a landmark bank branch at the corner of West 43rd Street and Fifth Avenue in Midtown Manhattan (here seen in 2003)

During the late 1930s and 1940s, Manufacturers Trust introduced several new services to retail banking, including personal loans and loans for property improvement and construction purposes. In 1944, the bank had 67 branches. In 1950, Manufacturers Trust grew even bigger when it acquired the Brooklyn Trust Company after outbidding Chase Bank for it. As a result, the number of branches that the bank had rose to over a hundred. One landmark branch that opened in 1954 at 510 Fifth Avenue in Midtown Manhattan is known as the Manufacturers Trust Company Building; built in the International Style, its spacious luminous feel, large glass facade, and the bank vault's visibility from the street were an immediate success with customers and even became a tourist attraction.

== Manufacturers Hanover Trust ==
The 1960–1986 Logo

=== Origin in merger ===
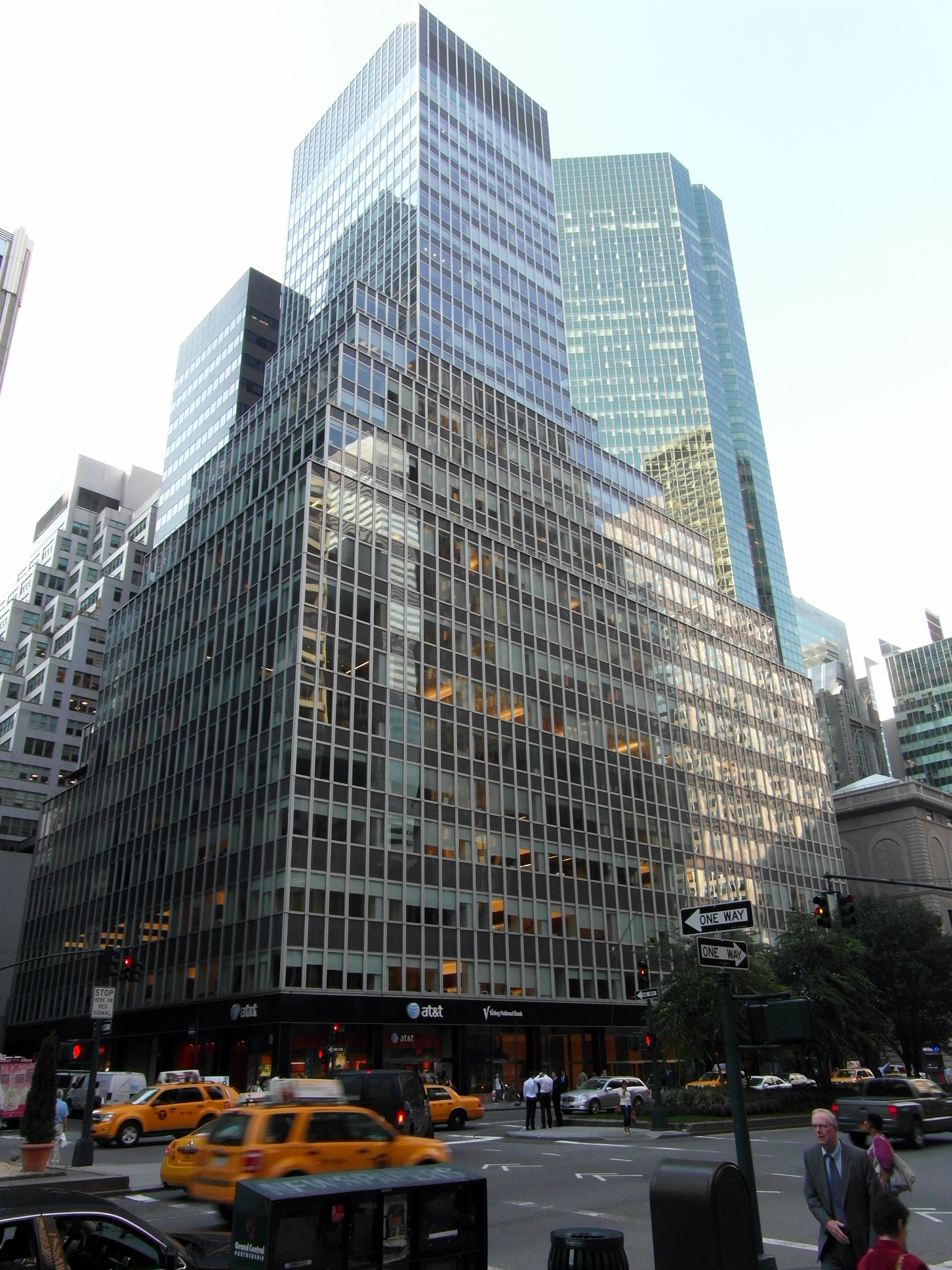
The newly merged Manufacturers Hanover Trust Company had its headquarters at 350 Park Avenue, between 51st Street and 52nd Street.

On January 17, 1961, it was announced that Manufacturers Trust Company had agreed to merge with Hanover Bank, creating the Manufacturers Hanover Trust Company. The planned entity would become the fourth-largest bank in the United States and the third-largest in New York City. Charles J. Stewart was the new company's first president and chairman.

The bank moved into new headquarters at 350 Park Avenue in Midtown Manhattan during 1961, leasing space from the Uris Buildings Corporation (in 1963, the Manufacturers Hanover Trust Company would purchase the 30-story building for itself).

The merger was approved by the New York State Banking Department in June 1961 and then by the Federal Reserve Board in September 1961. The merger closed on September 8, 1961, a couple of days after the Fed assent, in an effort to forestall any possible action from the United States Department of Justice Antitrust Division. However, minutes after the merger papers were filed, the Justice Department filed suit against the banks to block it from proceeding.

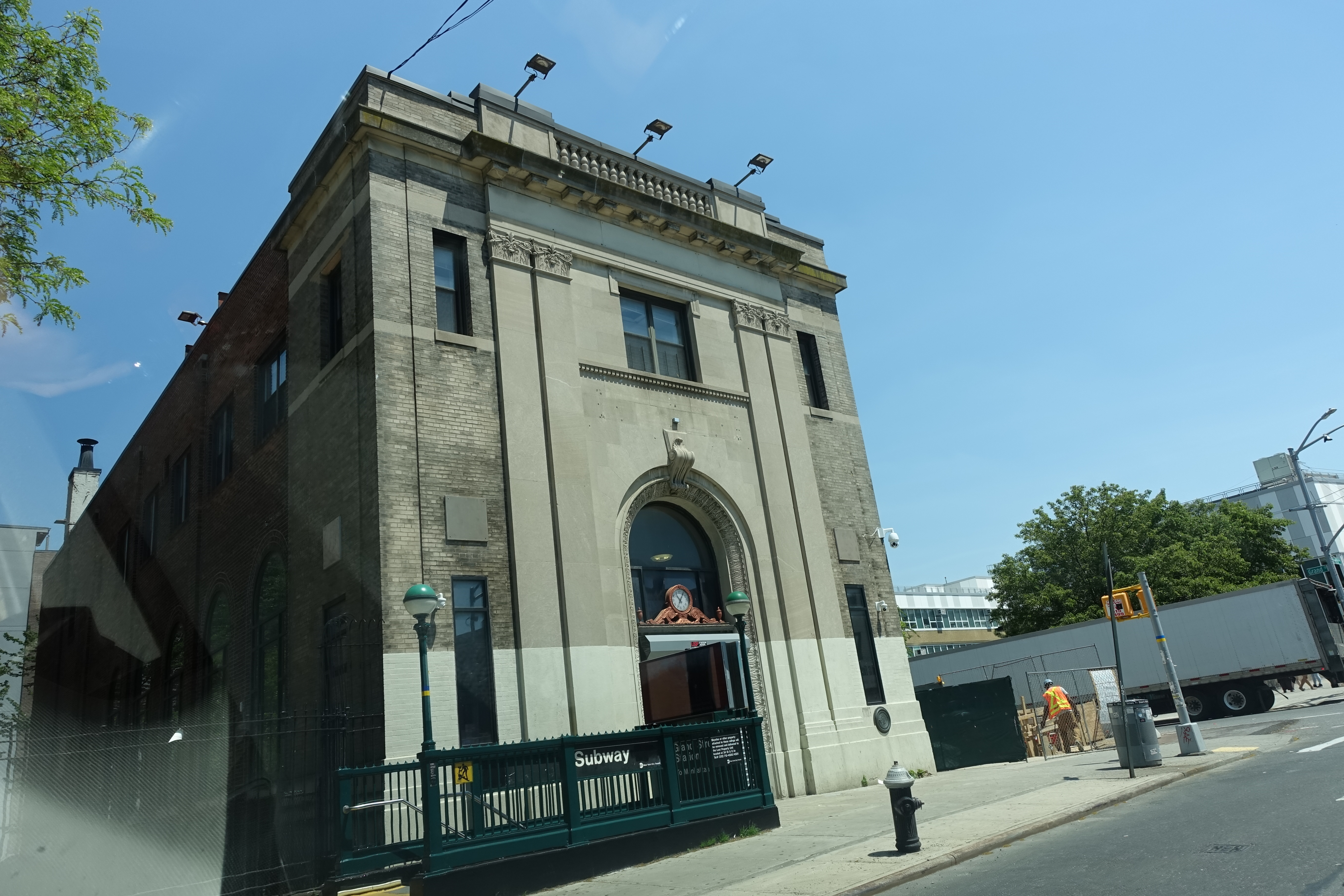
A later branch in Bushwick, Brooklyn

Five years of court cases ensued, complicated by the U.S. Supreme Court case United States v. Philadelphia National Bank (1963), which interpreted the Bank Merger Act of 1960 as to allow the forbiddance of mergers such as the Manufacturers Hanover Trust one. One U.S. court refused to block the merger, while another U.S. court ruled that a "demerger" must take place. During this time, Robert E. McNeill Jr., first president and then chairman and chief executive officer, and Gabriel Hauge, vice chairman and then president of Manufacturers Hanover, led the company's efforts to keep the merger in place. In 1966, a new law was passed by Congress; it clarified the Bank Merger Act and cleared the way for the mergers in question, and Manufacturers Hanover reached an agreement with the Department of Justice.

=== Years of success ===
Through its existence, the bank was often referred to as "Manny Hanny."

In 1969, a rearrangement was done such that the holding company Manufacturers Hanover Corporation was created, and the bank was made a subsidiary of that. At the same time, shares in Manufacturers Hanover Corporation were listed on the New York Stock Exchange (historically, most banks resisted listing and were sold instead over-the-counter.) Manufacturers Hanover remained the nation's fourth-largest bank.

Hauge was named chairman in 1971, succeeding McNeill, who retired. But the effective leadership of the corporation went to its president, John F. McGillicuddy, who had risen quickly within the ranks of the bank. In 1979, Hauge retired, and McGillicuddy held all three titles of president, chairman, and chief executive officer.

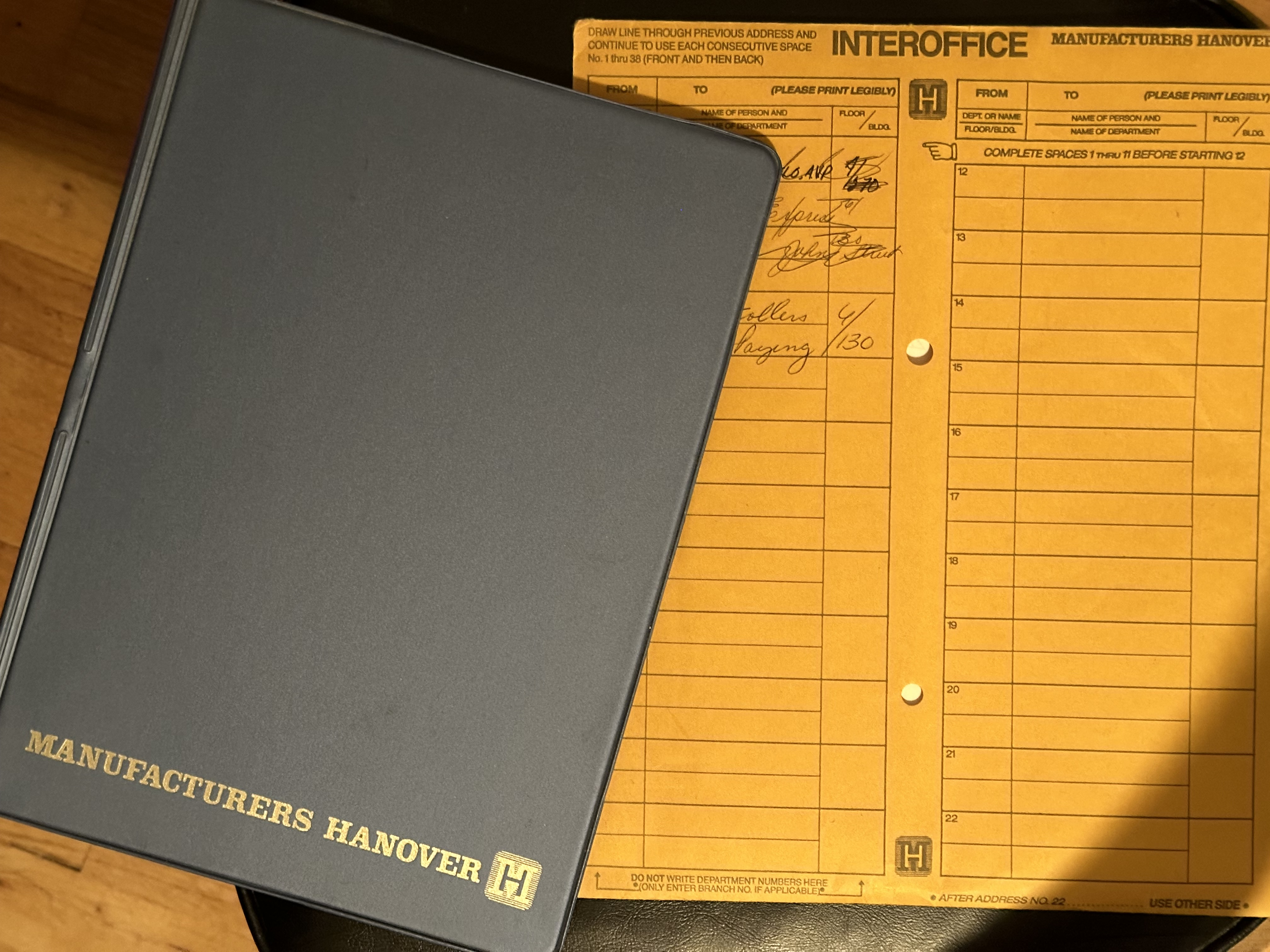
MHT presentation folder and interoffice envelope, early-mid-1980s

As a clearing house, Manufacturers Hanover was a core member of the Clearing House Interbank Payments System (CHIPS) that began operation in 1970.

It was considered among the top American banks, alongside Citicorp and Chase Manhattan Bank, and had a reputation for stability. Among commercial banks in New York City, it was the only one still willing to distribute food stamps and to cash welfare checks, and the bank became a main source of financing for check-cashing stores. Manufacturers Hanover had a sense of internal loyalty, wherein layoffs were avoided and lifetime employment was fairly common. It also had a sense of loyalty towards its customers, with relationships formed over long associations and activities such as time spent together on golf courses. One successful instance of such a relationship was its successful rescue plan for the troubled Chrysler Corporation.

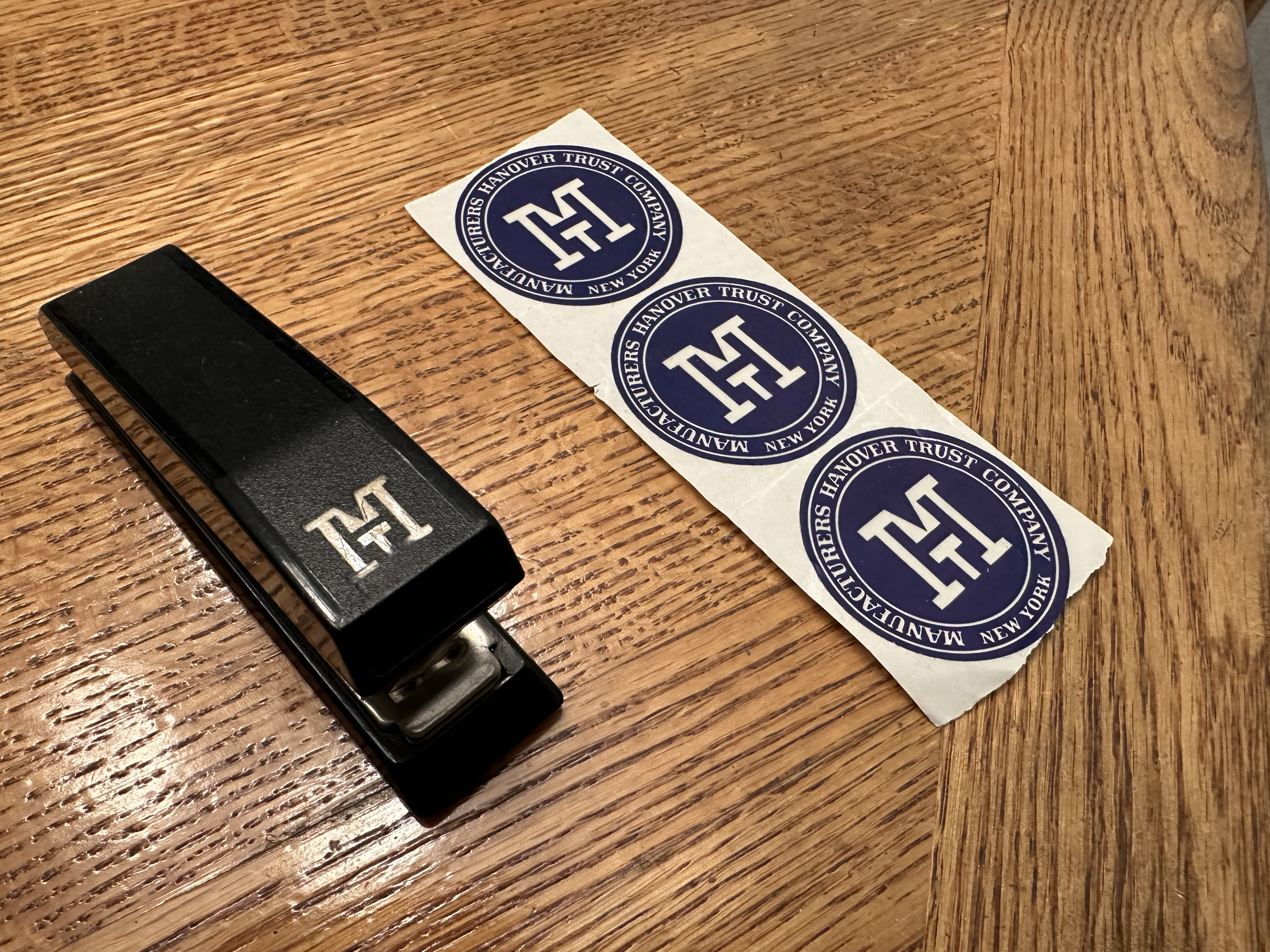
MHT office stapler and stickers

As of the early 1970s, MHT was a New York-based bank with a few offices overseas, but then over the next decade, it grew its outside-of-New-York presence substantially. It grew within New York City as well, finding twice the amount of usable space in 1981 when it moved into new headquarters at 270 Park Avenue, having bought that building from the Union Carbide Corporation. By 1982, it had more than 700 offices across 32 states in the country and another 102 branches across 40 nations around the world. Three operations were headquartered in Dallas, Texas: Manufacturers Hanover Commercial Corp., which did commercial financing; Manufacturers Hanover Leasing Corp., which was the largest bank-associated leasing outfit in the world, with 45 global branches; and MH/Edie Investment Counsel Inc., which offered investment services.

By the early to mid-1980s, Manufacturers Hanover was both a major money center bank and still heavily engaged in retail banking. It grew its merchant banking and investment banking operations, with offices in major financial hubs around the world. It would establish a division for trading in currency swaps and foreign exchange options. Among banks, Manufacturers Hanover Corporation also contained the second-largest mortgage banking house and the fourth-largest mortgage banking operation in the world, and its consumer finance network was the third largest among banks.

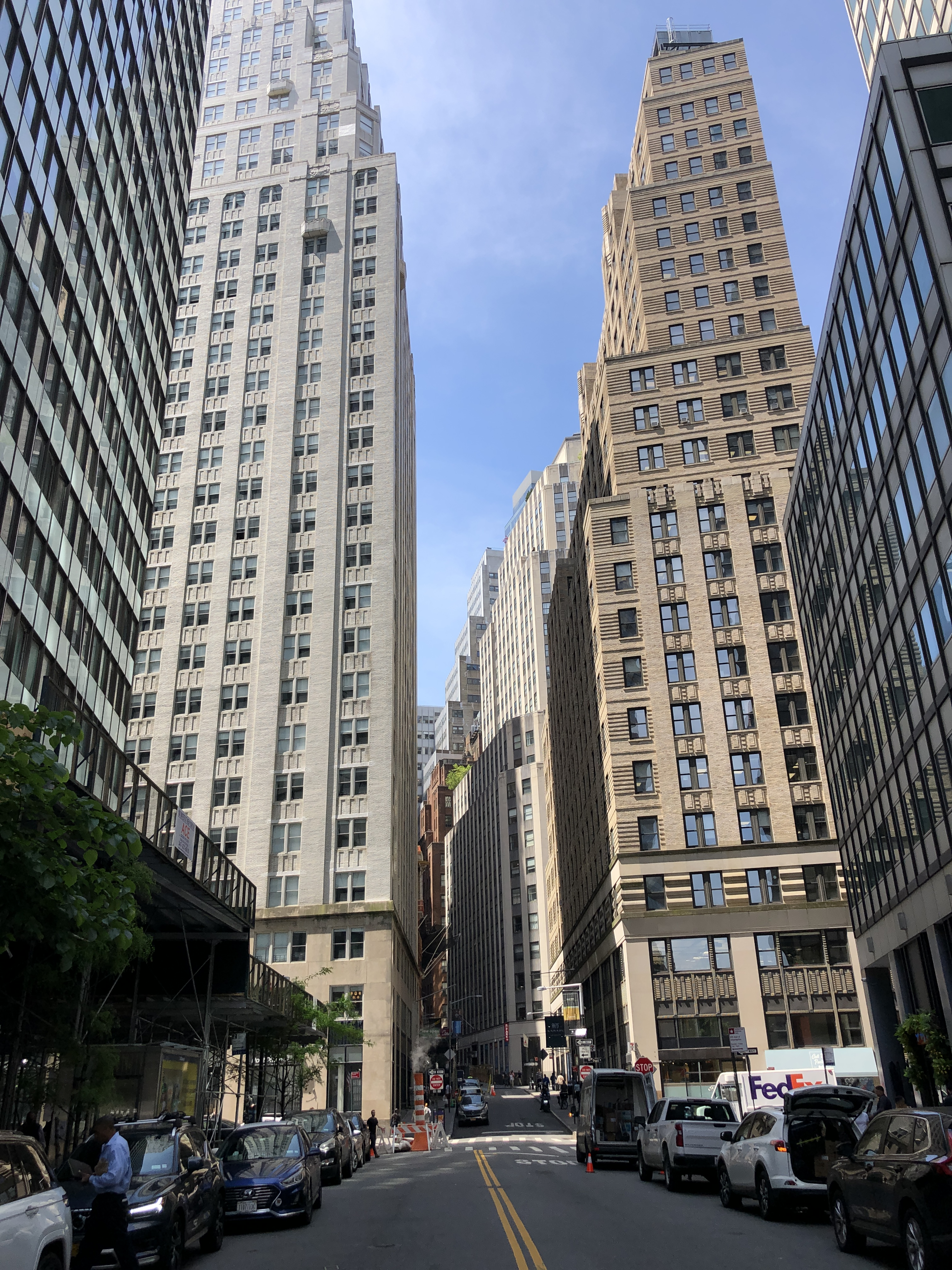
MHT also had a presence in New York's financial district, such as at 130 John Street (on the far left, as seen in 2024)

MHT was one of the banks that created the CIRRUS interbank network in the early 1980s for providing cash and other personal banking transactions nationwide. For its large internal data processing systems at the time, such as the Wholesale Banking System, a common environment was IBM mainframes running CICS for online applications with IMS as the database and IBM's DB/DC Data Dictionary.

In 1983, Manufacturers Hanover agreed to acquire the CIT Financial Corporation for some $1.5 billion, an amount that no bank holding company had ever spent on a single acquisition before. When the deal closed in 1984, it created the biggest factoring unit across the globe.

An up-and-coming executive was Peter J. Tobin, who was responsible for the bank's controller, accounting, and management information systems. This operation was centered in MHT's offices at 130 John Street in New York's financial district. He became chief financial officer at MHT and played an important role in the CIT acquisition.

Up through the early 1980s, Manufacturers Hanover remained the fourth largest bank in the nation.

=== Advertising ===
New York was the city in the country with the most competition between banks, especially after changes in regulations allowed savings-and-loan institutions to compete with commercial banks for consumer checking accounts, and hence advertising became a key component in banks' efforts to gain new customers. In the 1970s, Manufacturers Hanover ran a series of television commercials made by Young & Rubicam that used the tagline "It's banking the way you want it to be" and that featured the actor and comedian Tim Conway as a celebrity spokesperson. Another comedic talent on MHT commercials was the actor and game show personality Paul Lynde, with one spot featuring a concluding voiceover from the Twilight Zone writer and narrator Rod Serling.

At the same time, a large Manufacturers Hanover billboard advertising "Super Checking" was a prominent feature of the newly renovated Yankee Stadium. The billboard could be considered Chris Chambliss hit the walk-off home run that won the 1976 American League Championship Series for the New York Yankees over the Kansas City Royals.

Also during the 1970s, Manufacturers Hanover heavily promoted its "Any Car" Loan using an "Any Car," known as the "ForChevAmChrysVagen," made up of parts from over twenty different cars. Subsequently, AnyCar II and AnyCar III appeared, which were made of parts from about 50 and 40 different automobile models, respectively.

=== Sponsorships ===
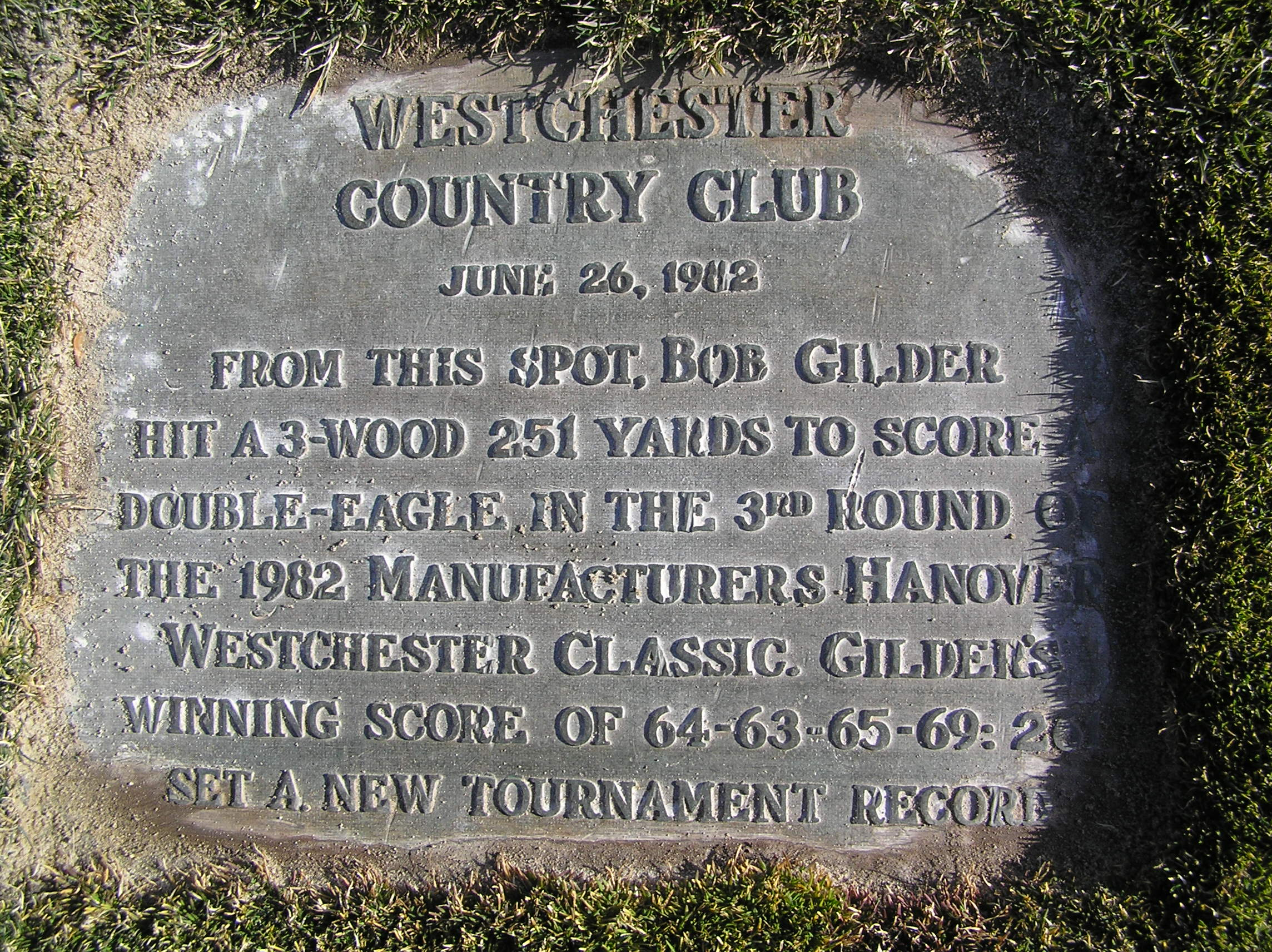
Plaque commemorating a memorable shot and tournament at the 1982 Manufacturers Hanover Westchester Classic

The bank was involved in sponsoring a number of different sports events, many of which were arranged by bank executive Charles Henry McCabe Jr. These included the Manufacturers Hanover Westchester Classic professional golf tournament held during the 1980s at the Westchester Country Club north of New York City, a stop on the PGA Tour that, during its time with MHT as the title sponsor, featured winners such as Seve Ballesteros and Curtis Strange. Other Manufacturers Hanover sponsorships were in association with the New York Mets baseball team and the US Open Tennis Championships.

The bank was a founding sponsor of the New York City Marathon and over the years held exclusive events there for their most moneyed clients. Moreover, it was the creator, in 1977, of the Manufacturers Hanover Corporate Challenge running event, which quickly grew in size and number of instances and locations and became highly effective in promoting name visibility. By 1988, there were eighteen Corporate Challenge events per year, and some five thousand companies entered teams in them, with Manufacturers Hanover soliciting business from the best prospects among them. The challenge has existed to this day under successor names.

=== Troubles ===
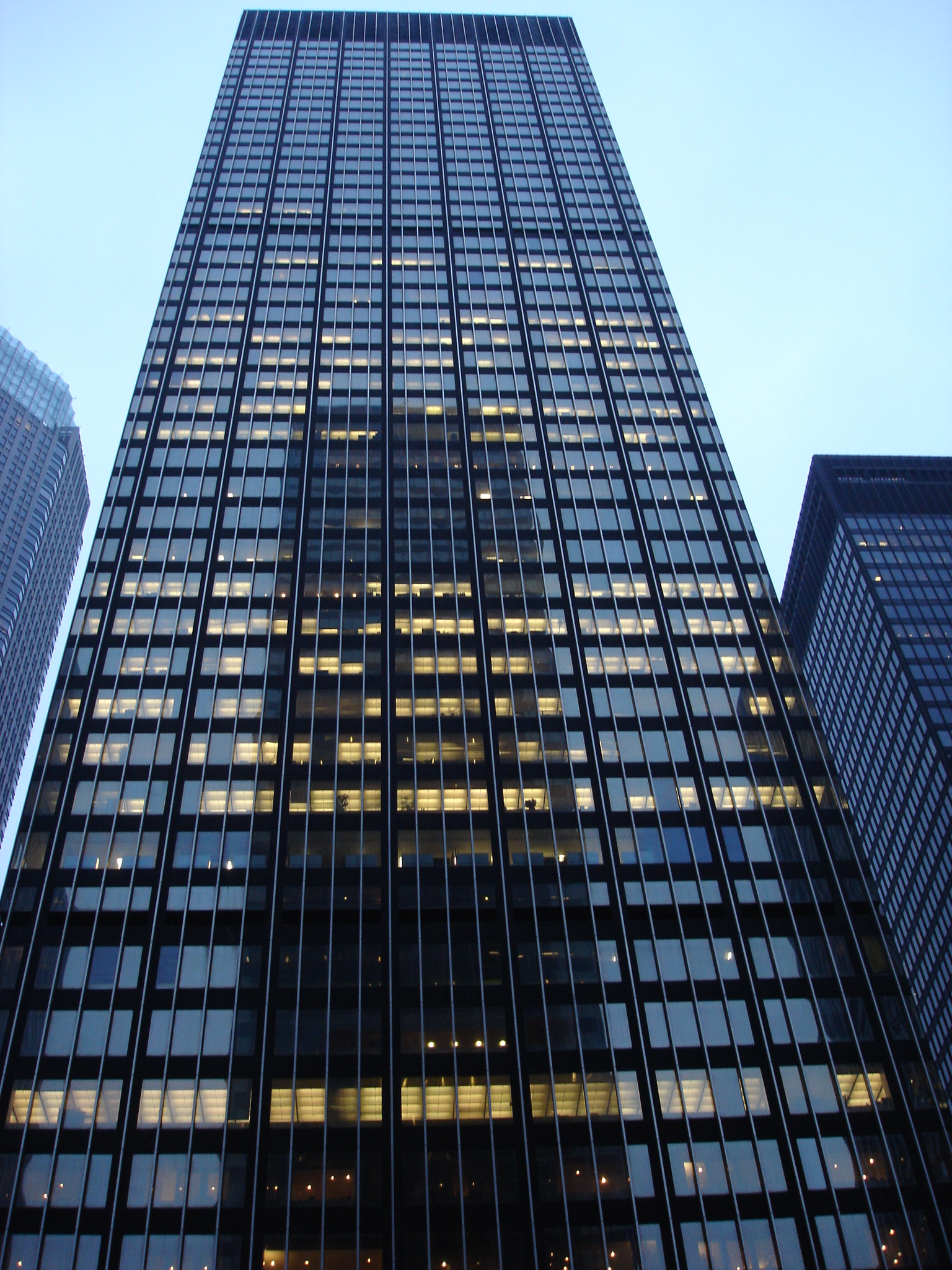
Manufacturers Hanover Corporation headquarters from 1981 on were at 270 Park Avenue in Midtown Manhattan, between 47th and 48th Streets; kept as the headquarters of successor companies through JPMorgan Chase.

The stock price for Manufacturers Hanover began to fall precipitously during 1984, in large part because the bank was exposed to nearly $7 billion of loans to Central and South America, in particular to Mexico, Venezuela, Brazil, and especially Argentina. In addition, MHT followed a "lending banking" model where instead of investment banking, it made traditional short-term loans to corporate customers, but those customers were instead increasingly borrowing via the commercial paper market. A rumor in global financial markets that MHT was having trouble meeting its daily funding requirements proved false but nonetheless shook confidence in the bank.

Beginning in 1985, McGillicuddy staged three years' worth of internal cost reductions, layoffs, and operational reorganizations to stave off the need to be acquired or to receive a federal bailout. The Washington Post characterized the effort as "Manny Hanny dust[ing] off after a nasty fall."

Around 1987, the bank bought some of the branches of Dollar Dry Dock Savings Bank. In 1991, it bought the New York City branches of the failed Goldome. By 1988, Manufacturers Hanover had fallen to being the nation's sixth-largest bank, or sometimes seventh-largest. Manufacturers Hanover employed 19,721 full-time equivalent workers in the second quarter of 1990.

By 1991, Manufacturers Hanover was the ninth-largest bank company in the United States and had $61.3 billion in assets. It had over $39 billion in deposits across 228 branches and some 18,400 employees in total. Of those branches, 141 were in New York City, 32 on Long Island, 24 in nearby upstate counties, and 31 in further upstate New York. The last group of those were centered in Albany, Syracuse, Rochester, and Buffalo. It was one of the largest and oldest banks in the United States, and as such, it was one of the most recognized bank names in the country.

However, it was suffering financially due to the series of non-performing loans to developing nations. In addition, MHT had been trying to lower its exposure to real estate since the mid-1980s, but still in the new decade some $385 million of their $3.5 billion in commercial property loans were considered delinquent. Real estate figures who were struggling to repay their loans included Peter S. Kalikow, Donald Trump, and William Zeckendorf Jr. The general economic environment for banks was also affected by the early 1990s recession.

=== Acquisition by Chemical Bank ===
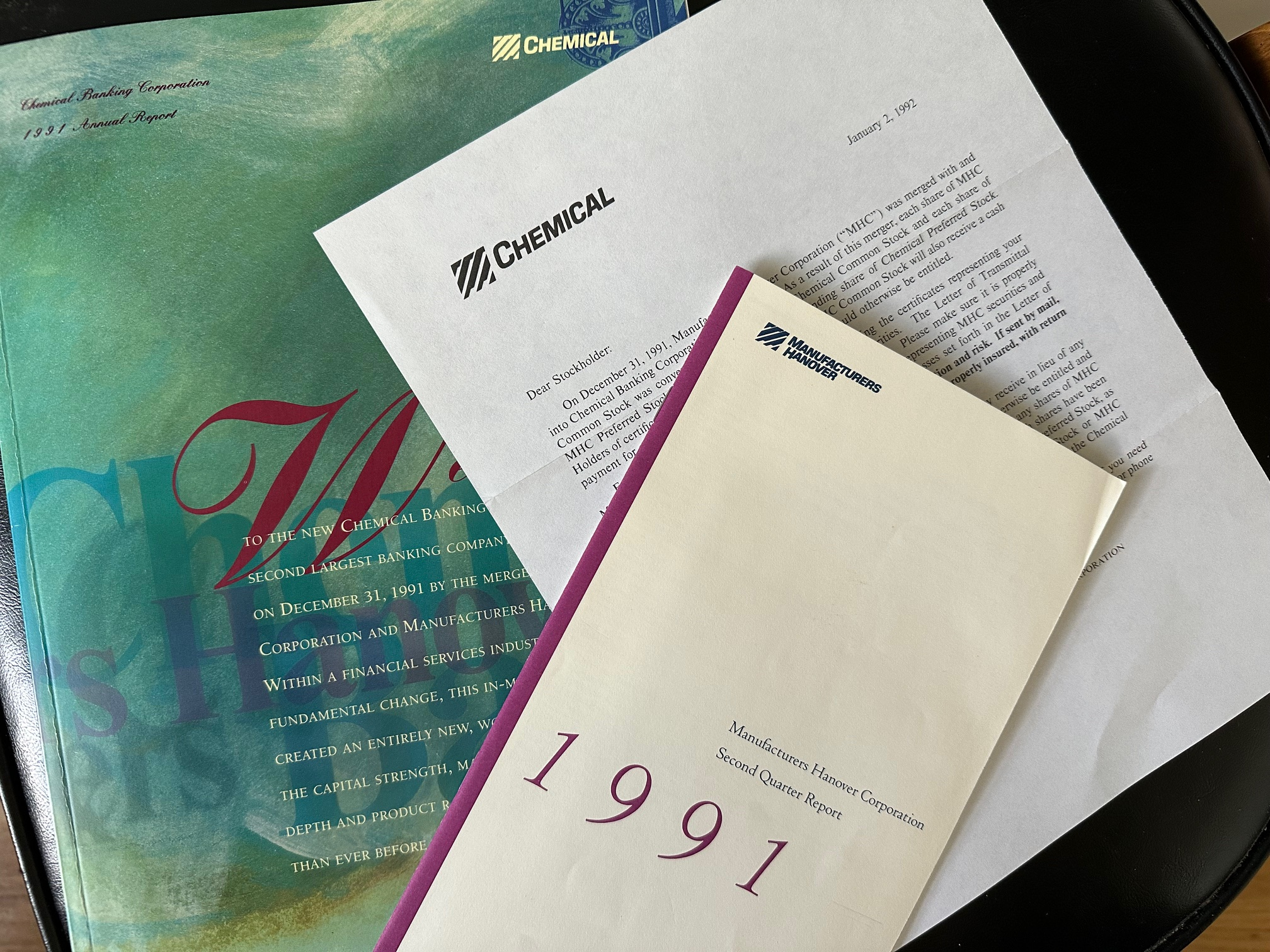
Three documents discussing the merger: Quarterly report from Manufacturers Hanover Corporation and letter to shareholders and annual report from Chemical Banking Corporation

On July 15, 1991, it was announced that the Manufacturers Hanover Corporation would engage in a friendly merger with the Chemical Banking Corporation. Although the action was described as a "marriage of equals," the resulting company would be known by the Chemical name. Chemical was also suffering from bad loans, many of them in real estate. In corporate banking, Manufacturers Hanover was better established with larger, blue-chip companies, whereas Chemical was stronger with small- and medium-sized businesses. The theory behind the merger was that the combination of the two companies, which would have combined assets of over $135 billion, would be economically more robust and a stronger competitor. Substantial layoffs and sales of assets were planned to take place among the combined companies. The Manufacturers name would gradually disappear.

McGillicuddy would serve as chief executive of the merged Chemical until his planned retirement at the start of 1994, while Walter V. Shipley, the head of Chemical, would be president and chief operating officer of the merged company until he succeeded McGillicuddy. Some MHT executives, such as chief financial officer Tobin, continued on in the same position at Chemical. However, Thomas S. Johnson, who had been president of MHT for the previous eight years and had been viewed as the heir apparent to McGillicuddy, was a loser in the merger and departed.

The transaction was valued at about $1.9 billion, and at the time, Manufacturers Hanover–Chemical was the largest bank merger ever to take place in the United States. The resulting bank would become the second-largest in the country, behind only Citicorp. News of the merger was the lead story in the New York Times the next day.

Unlike the 1961 merger, there was little opposition to this one, and indeed the action was endorsed by Chuck Schumer, a U.S. Representative from New York who was prominent on banking matters, and by E. Gerald Corrigan, the head of the Federal Reserve Bank of New York, who believed that U.S. banks needed to consolidate to gain more impact around the world. Indeed, it became part of a nationwide wave of mergers and consolidation within the banking industry.

The merger was formally closed on a legal basis on December 31, 1991. The merger was accounted for as a pooling of interests. As of that day, the two bank holding companies had merged, and Manufacturers Hanover no longer existed as an independent corporate establishment.

=== Aftermath ===
Chemical adopted Manufacturers Hanover's logo design and moved into its headquarters at 270 Park Avenue. For a while after the merger, Manufacturers Hanover Trust still existed as a separate bank from Chemical Bank, albeit owned by Chemical Banking Corporation, and MHT branches still existed under that name as well. However, the 31 far-upstate branches did not stay with Chemical but instead were sold to Fleet Bank.

Then MHT was incorporated as a part of Chemical Bank itself, and in particular the various electronic funds transfer systems were converted over, such as the SWIFT code changing from MAHA33 to CHEMUS33; similar changes were made in the CHIPS system as well as in Fedwire. The New York Times assessed on June 22, 1992, that the code switchovers meant that "Quietly, ... the 180-year-old Manufacturers Hanover Trust Company ceased to exist as an independent bank."

After that would follow the closing of some branches and the changing of the signs on the others. The final public vestige of the bank disappeared on April 5, 1993, when a branch on Madison Avenue in Midtown Manhattan had its Manufacturers Hanover logo replaced as part of a ceremonial event that featured a brass band. As one newspaper headline read, "Manny Hanny's Gone; New Chemical Lives On."

However, in many respects parts of MHT remained dominant within Chemical, such as in information systems and at the executive level. Indeed, one trade publication assessed that "The merged bank now seems like little more than a Chemical facade on an MHT core." In any case, the merger was generally viewed as a success.

Then in 1995 it was announced that the new Chemical was buying Chase Manhattan Bank; although Chemical was the acquiring company and the nominal survivor, the merged bank adopted the Chase name, which was considered to be better known, especially overseas. That deal closed in 1996.

Subsequently, in the year 2000, it was announced that Chase Manhattan was merging with J.P. Morgan & Co. to form J.P. Morgan Chase & Co. The deal closed later that year, with 270 Park Avenue remaining the headquarters location. The Associated Press's coverage of the merger included an illustration of how the three decades of Manufacturers Hanover Trust's existence were part of the makeup of the new financial giant.

== Timeline of mergers and name changes ==
The origins timeline:

- 1853 – Mechanics' Bank of Williamsburgh (established)
- 1858 – Name change to Manufacturers' Bank of Brooklyn (no merger involved)
- 1865 – Convert to federal Manufacturers National Bank of New York (charter changed)
- 1868 – Name change To Manufacturers National Bank of Brooklyn (no merger involved)
- 1914 – Merge to state Citizens Trust Company of Brooklyn

The timeline that continues indicates, unless otherwise noted, the purchase of the named entity by Manufacturers Hanover Corporation or its immediate controlling predecessors. Exceptions include the first and last entries (original charter and dissolution of the company by buyout, respectively), and several name changes.

- 1905 – Citizens Trust Company of Brooklyn (original New York State charter, no direct predecessors)
- 1912 – Broadway Bank of Brooklyn
- 1914 – Manufacturers National Bank of Brooklyn, resulting in name change to Manufacturers-Citizens Trust Company
- 1915 – Name change to Manufacturers Trust Company (no merger involved)
- 1918 – West Side Bank
- 1921 – Ridgewood National Bank
- 1922 – North Side Bank of Brooklyn
- 1922 – Industrial Bank of New York
- 1923 – Columbia Bank
- 1925 – Yorkville Bank
- 1925 – Gotham National Bank
- 1925 – Fifth National Bank of the City of New York
- 1927 – Commonwealth Bank
- 1927 – Standard Bank
- 1928 – United Capitol National Bank and Trust Company
- 1929 – State Bank & Trust Company
- 1930 – Pacific Trust Company
- 1931 – Midtown Bank of New York
- 1931 – Bryant Park Bank
- 1931 – Midwood Trust Company
- 1932 – Chatham Phenix National Bank & Trust Company
- 1937 – Equitable Trust Company of New York (1930–1937)
- 1939 – Banca Commerciale Italiana Trust Co. of New York
- 1942 – Standard National Bank, Woodside, N.Y.
- 1946 – Flatbush National Bank of Brooklyn
- 1947 – Fidelity National Bank in New York, The
- 1949 – National Bronx Bank of New York
- 1950 – Brooklyn Trust Company
- 1953 – Peoples Industrial
- 1961 – Central Hanover Bank & Trust Company, results in name change to Manufacturers Hanover Trust Company (parent named Manufacturers Hanover Corporation)
- 1991 – Goldome (assets)
- 1991 – Purchased by Chemical Banking Corporation, and ceases to exist

== Earlier history of Central Hanover Bank & Trust Company ==
The other side of the company name Manufacturers Hanover Corporation, and its primary banking subsidiary of Manufacturers Hanover Trust, was the other side of the merger of predecessor Manufacturers Trust with Central Hanover Bank & Trust.

Central Hanover was also a large, well-known bank before that merger. It was formed in 1929 from the merger of two other banking giants of the time, Central Union Trust Company and Hanover National Bank. The Hanover bank had been named for George I of Great Britain, the first monarch of the House of Hanover.

Hanover National built one of the early skyscrapers of New York, the Hanover National Building at 11 Nassau Street. It had twenty-two floors and was 385 feet high.

The corporate history of predecessor Hanover Bank is as follows:

- 1851 – Established Hanover Bank, NYS charter
- 1865 – Name change to Hanover National Bank of the City of New York (Federal)
- 1929 – Name change to Hanover Bank of the City of New York (NYS)
- 1929 – Bought by Central Union Trust Company of New York (see below)

The corporate history of predecessor Central Union Trust Company is as follows:

- 1873 – Established Central Trust Company of New York
- 1901 – Continental National Bank of New York (est. 1853)
- 1912 – Gallatin National Bank of the City of New York (est. 1829)
- 1918 – Union Trust Company of New York; changed name to Central Union Trust Company of New York
- 1927 – Greenwich National Bank of the City of New York (est. 1830)
- 1929 – Hanover Bank of the City of New York; changed name to Central Hanover Bank and Trust Company
- 1951 – Changed name to Hanover Bank (no merger)
- 1961 – Bought by Manufacturers Trust Company

== See also ==
- List of bank mergers in the United States
