= John McGillicuddy =

American banker (1930–2009)

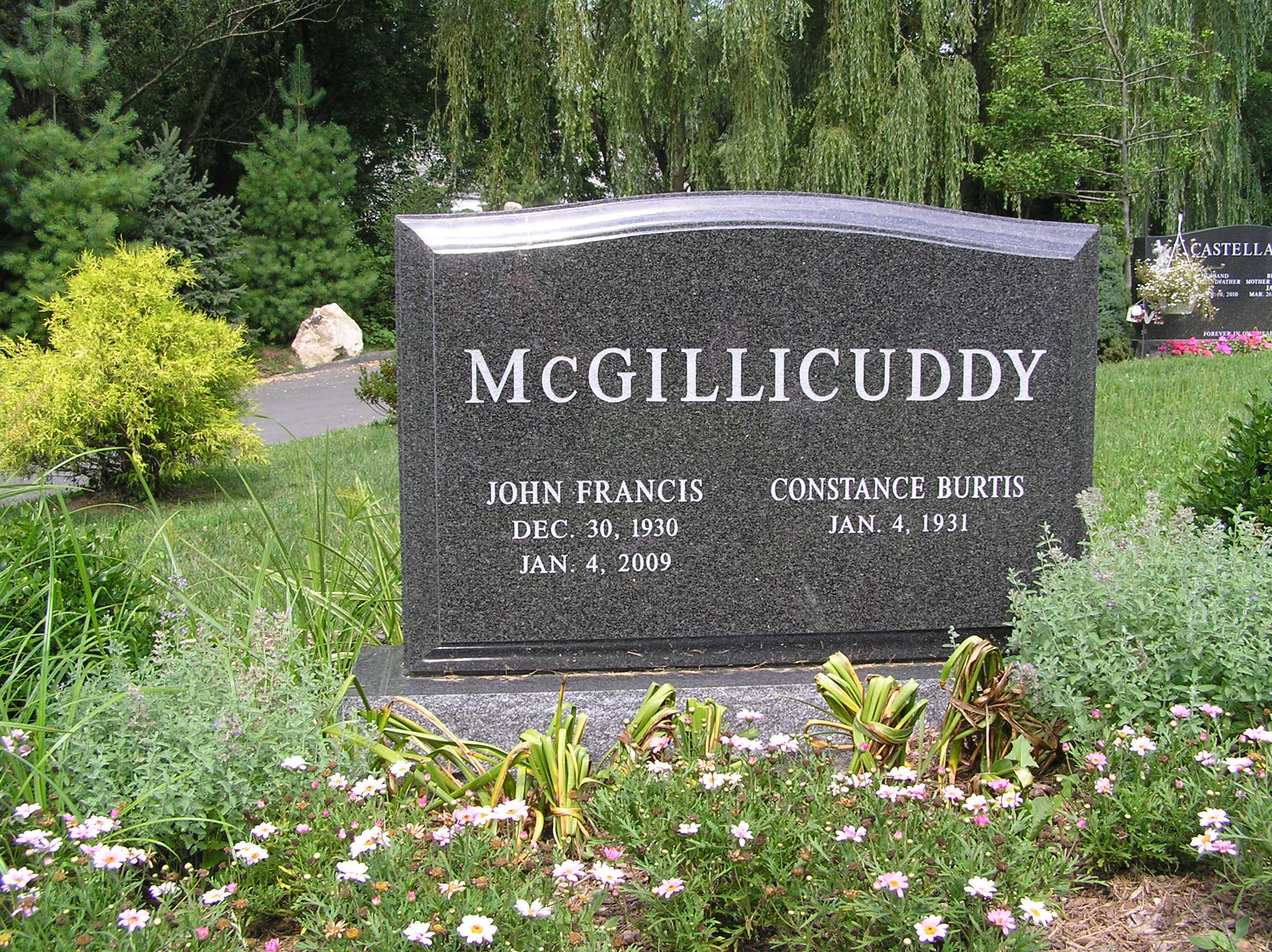
The gravesite of John McGillicuddy

John Francis McGillicuddy (December 30, 1930 – January 4, 2009) was an American banking industry executive who oversaw the merger between Manufacturers Hanover Trust and Chemical Bank in the early 1990s.

McGillicuddy played football for Harrison High School and then attended Princeton University on a football scholarship, playing defensive back on the college's undefeated football teams in 1950 and 1951. His roommate at Princeton was fellow football player Dick Kazmaier, who won the Heisman Trophy for 1951. John McGillicuddy later attended Harvard Law School and was hired by the law firm of Simpson Thacher & Bartlett after serving in the United States Navy.

He was hired by Manufacturers Trust Company in 1958. He was elected to serve as the bank's president in 1970 at age 39, making him one of the youngest people ever to run a major banking company, after his predecessor R. E. McNeil, Jr. announced that he would be stepping down.

During New York City's fiscal crisis during the 1970s, McGillicuddy helped organize the financial aid needed to bail out the city. He later played a key role in the late 1970s in the Bailout of Chrysler, working to organize the government loan guarantees that helped that company avoid bankruptcy.

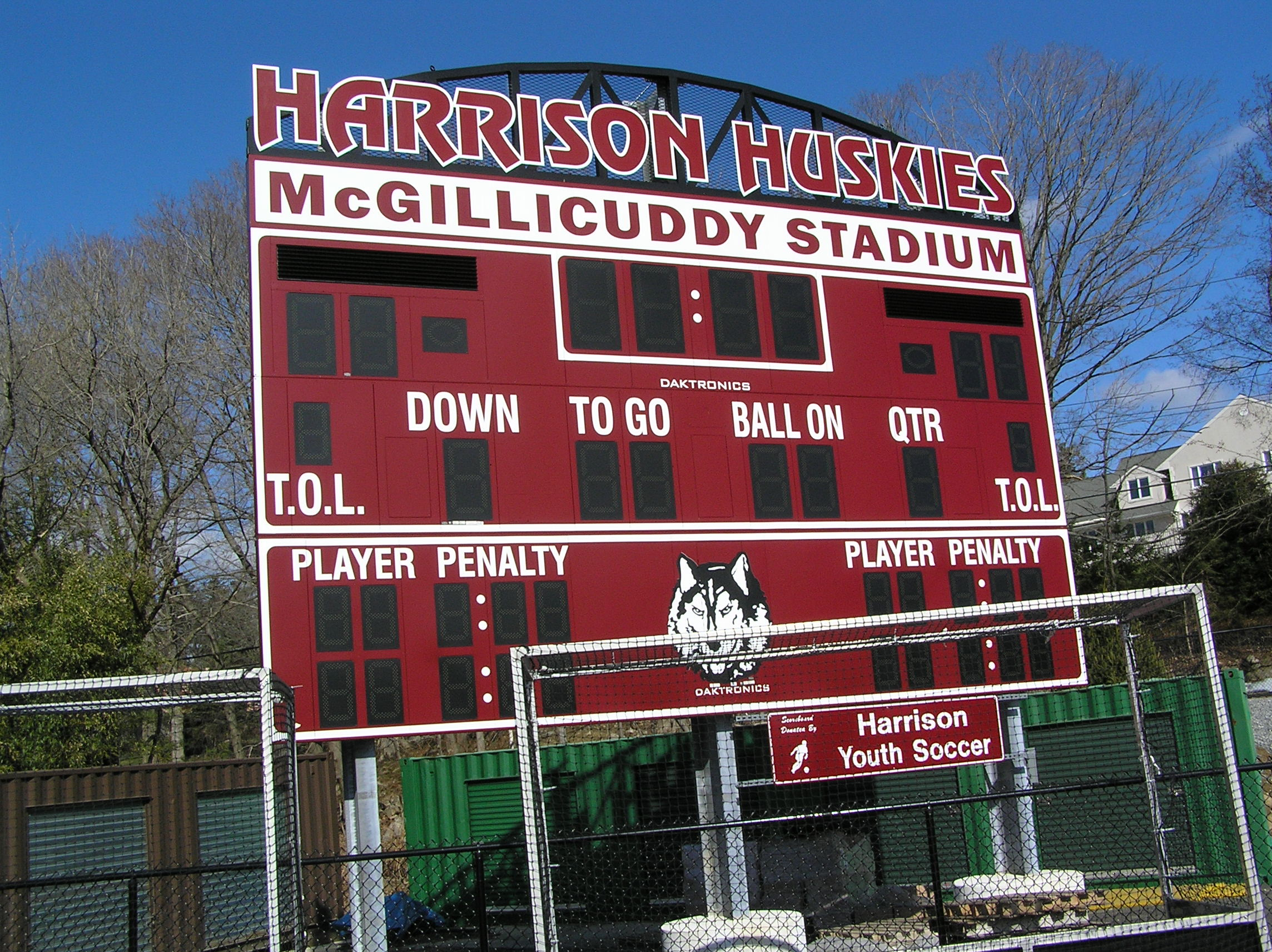
The John McGillicuddy Scoreboard at Harrison High School

In 1991, as chairman and chief executive of Manufacturers Hanover, McGillicuddy was the chief architect of a merger with the Chemical Banking Corporation that was the largest bank merger in the United States to that time, helping both companies deal with difficulties arising from problem loans in previous years. Following the merger, McGillicuddy became the chairman and chief executive of the combined institution, remaining with the bank until his retirement in 1993 when he was to be followed by Walter V. Shipley, who had been the chairman of Chemical.

The merger ushered in a wave of consolidation in the banking industry that continued with Chemical purchasing Chase Manhattan Corporation and assuming that company's name in 1996 and a December 2000 deal with J.P. Morgan & Co. that formed JPMorgan Chase & Co.

McGillicuddy served on the boards of organizations and companies including the Boy Scouts of America, Kraft Foods, United Airlines and U.S. Steel.

McGillicuddy died at age 78 on January 4, 2009, at his home in Harrison, New York due to complications from prostate cancer. He is interred at Greenwood Union Cemetery.
