= Regional bank =

Depository institution which operates in a region of a country

A regional bank is a depository institution, such as a bank, savings and loan, or credit union, which is larger than a community bank and operates below the state level, but not so large that it would operate either nationally or internationally. A regional bank is one that operates in one region of a country, such as a province or within a group of provinces. Regional banks typically have a number of branches that serve individuals and businesses across a given region. The definition of what constitutes a regional bank is not precise, although the Federal Reserve describes it as an organization "with total assets between $10 billion and $100 billion".

The term is often used in the United States where regional banks are more common and within stock trading, when referring to investing in different bank types, usually referred to as regional bank ETF's (exchange-traded funds). They generally provide, with some limitations, the same services as larger banks, such as deposits; loans, leases, mortgages, and credit cards; ATM networks; securities brokerage; investment banking; insurance sales; and mutual fund and pension fund management. They are also called 'sector-specific' lenders.

As of 2022, there are 134 regional banks with 13,109 branches in the United States.
