= Walter Shipley =

Walter Shipley may refer to:

- Walter V. Shipley, American banker
- Walter Penn Shipley, American lawyer, chess player and chess organizer
