= William B. Harrison Jr. =

American banker and former CEO of JP Morgan Chase

- Born: August 12, 1943 (age 83); Rocky Mount, North Carolina, US
- Education: Virginia Episcopal School; University of North Carolina at Chapel Hill (BA)
- Title: Former CEO of JP Morgan Chase
- Predecessor: Douglas A. Warner III
- Successor: Jamie Dimon
- Spouse: Anne Harrison
- Children: two daughters

William B. Harrison Jr. (born August 12, 1943) is an American investment banker who was the CEO and chairman of JPMorgan Chase from 2000 to 2005. As chairman and CEO of Chase, he and Douglas A. Warner III, then CEO of J.P. Morgan & Co., were the principal architects of the US$30.9 billion acquisition by Chase of J.P. Morgan & Co. in 2000, to form JPMorgan Chase & Co. Harrison has been a director of the firm or a predecessor institution since 1991.

== Education ==
He attended high school at Virginia Episcopal School, where he played basketball. He attended the University of North Carolina at Chapel Hill, where he was admitted to the Zeta Psi fraternity.

== Career ==
Having risen through the ranks of Chemical Bank before succeeding Walter V. Shipley during the Chemical Bank merger with the Chase Manhattan Corporation in 1995, which kept the Chase name.

As chairman and CEO of Chase, he and Douglas A. Warner III, then CEO of JP Morgan were the principal architects of the US$30.9 billion acquisition by Chase of J.P. Morgan & Co. in 2000, to form JPMorgan Chase & Co.

Jamie Dimon, former Bank One CEO, replaced Harrison as chairman on January 1, 2007, following Harrison's decision to step down from his chairman position of JPMorgan on December 31, 2006.

== Resume ==
- A.B. degree in economics from the University of North Carolina
- Graduate of the Harvard Business School's International Senior Management Programme in Switzerland

Director from 1991 to 2007 of JPMorgan Chase or a predecessor institution:

- Vice chairman of the board of Chemical Banking Corporation and then The Chase Manhattan Corporation, 1991 through June 1999
- President and chief executive officer of The Chase Manhattan Corporation, June through Dec. 1999
- Chairman and chief executive officer of The Chase Manhattan Corporation, Jan. 2000 through its merger with J.P. Morgan & Co. Incorporated, in Dec. 2000
- President and chief executive officer of JPMorgan Chase, Dec. 2000 through Nov. 2001
- Chairman and chief executive officer of JPMorgan Chase, Nov. 2001 through Dec. 2005
- Became chairman of JPMorgan Chase on December 31, 2005

Business positions
Preceded by Walter V. Shipley	Chase CEO; 1999	Succeeded by Merged with JP Morgan to become JP Morgan Chase
Preceded by Chase and J.P. Morgan merged to form company 2000	JPMorgan Chase CEO; 2000–2005	Succeeded by Jamie Dimon
