= John Stephenson (coachbuilder) =

American coachbuilder (1809-1893)

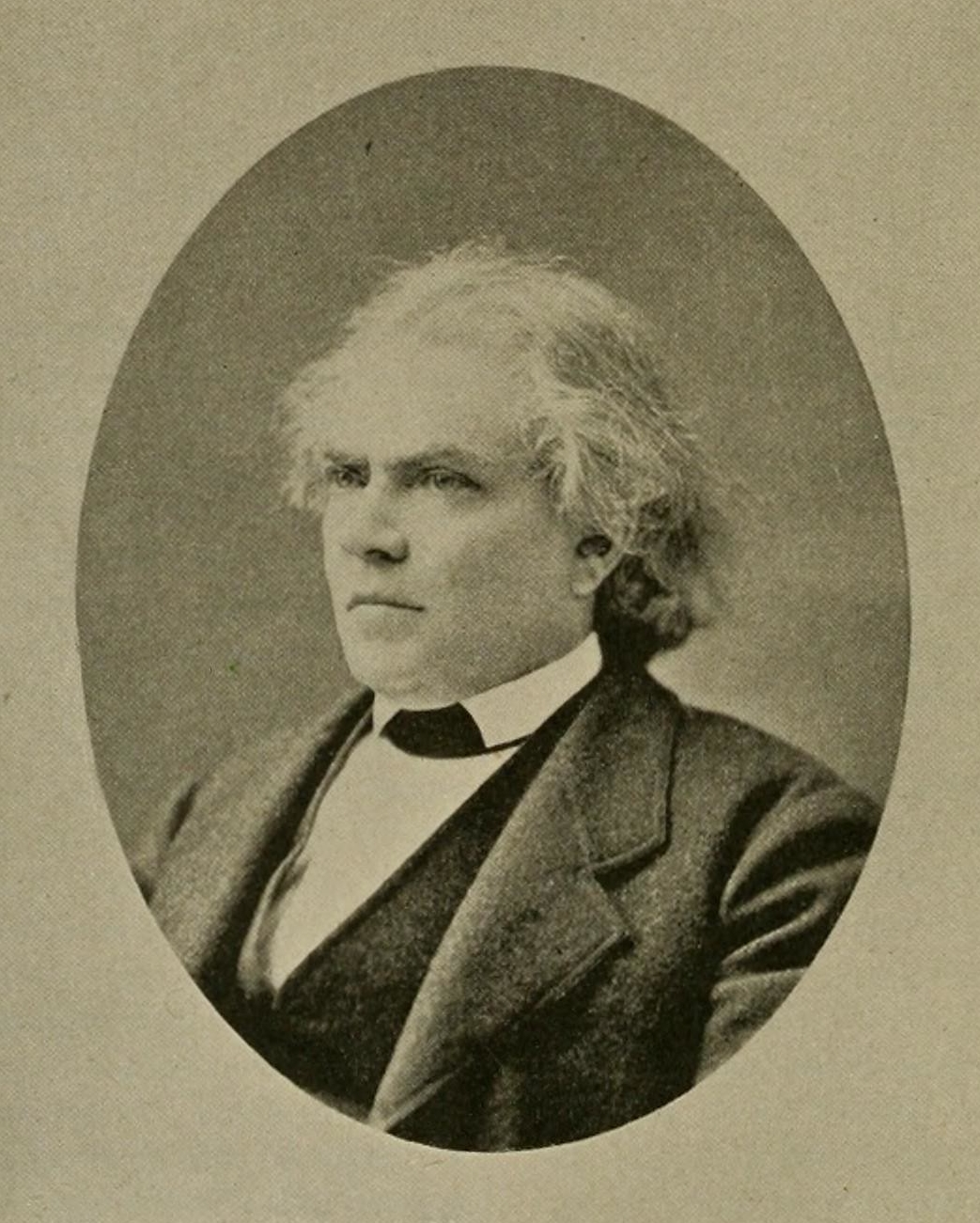
John Stephenson

John G. Stephenson (1809 in County Armagh, Ireland - 1893 in New Rochelle, New York, United States), an American coachbuilder, invented and patented the first streetcar to run on rails in the United States. Stephenson also designed the New York and Harlem Railroad which was formally opened on 26 November 1832. Twelve days later a horse-drawn streetcar built at Stephenson's works and named John Mason after the president of the railroad company, started the public service. Stephenson is therefore remembered as the creator of the tramway. Stephenson was the great-grandfather of Alan Stephenson Boyd, the first United States secretary of transportation.

== Life ==
John Stephenson emigrated to the United States from Ireland with his parents, James and Grace Stephenson, when he was two years old. After attending public schools in New York City, he completed his education at the Wesleyan University in Middletown, Connecticut. At the age of 19, he became an apprentice to Abram Brower, the pioneer of the Broadway stage lines.

Stephenson died at his summer home in New Rochelle, New York, in 1893.

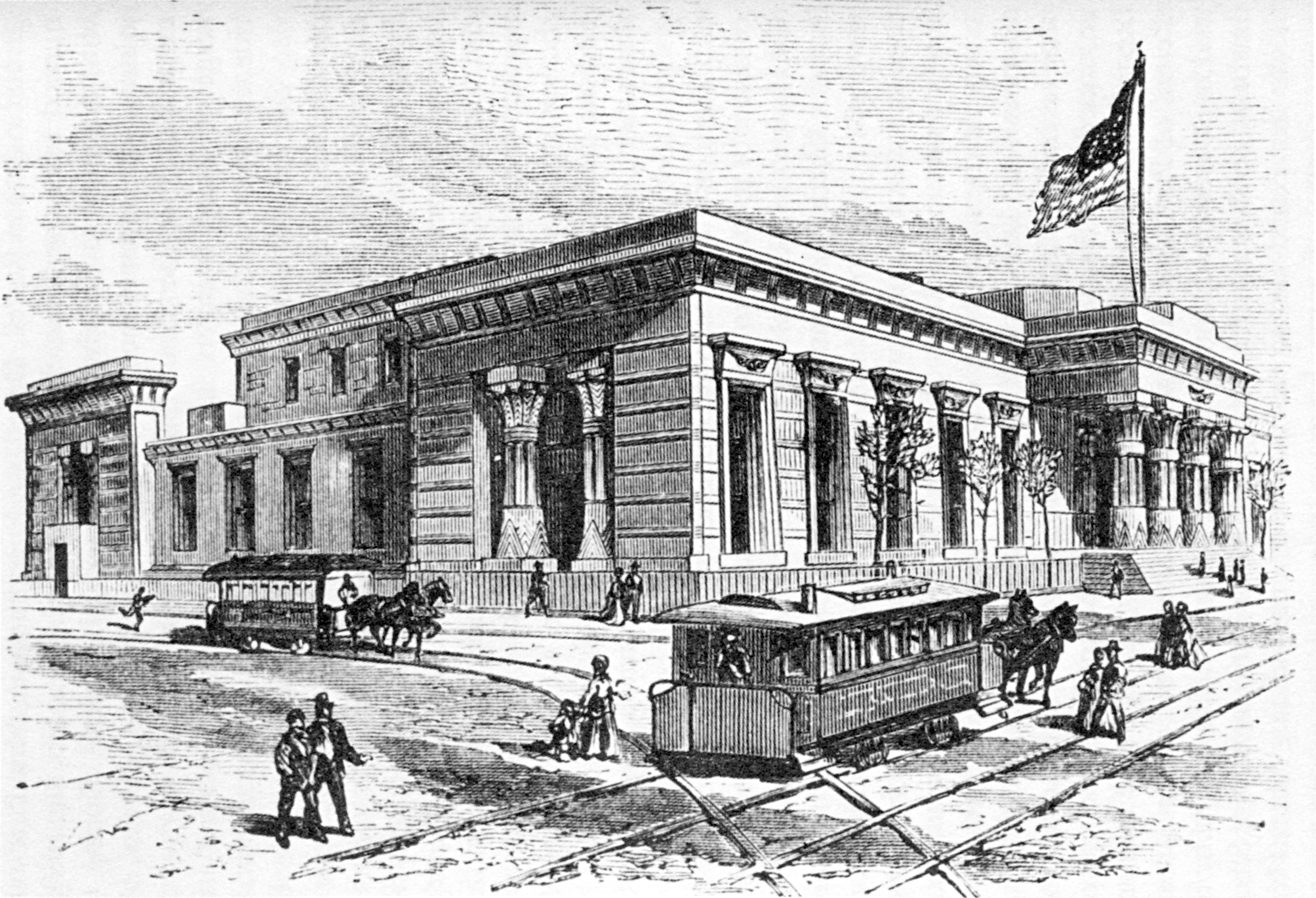
Streetcars in New York in 1870

== First streetcar ==
In May 1831, Stephenson started his own business, the John Stephenson Company, on 667 Broadway where he built omnibus cars for Brower until a fire destroyed his shop in March 1832. He immediately moved to a new site on Elizabeth Street near Bleecker where he continued to build omnibuses which proved to be a huge success on the streets of New York.

However, soon afterwards he received an order from John Mason, a successful merchant and banker, to build a horse car for the New York and Harlem Railroad which had just been granted a charter authorizing a route from Fourth Avenue and the Bowery north to the Harlem River. The first stretch was opened from Prince to 14th Street on November 26, 1832, with a procession of the four cars developed for the company. Stephenson's car, named "John Mason" or simply the "Mason" after the company's president, was in the lead with the mayor and other dignitaries. He had modeled it after the English four-wheeled passenger railroad car but dropped the body down over the wheels for easier access. Four horses pulled the car and it carried up to 30 passengers in its three compartments. It was Stephenson's design which was finally adopted. In April 1833, he obtained a U.S. patent for it.

== Failures and successes ==
Orders for his design came in not only received from New York and other U.S. cities but also from Cuba. In 1836, business prospered even more rapidly after Ross Winans developed his eight-wheeled vehicles. Stephenson built a larger factory at Fourth Avenue and 129th Street. At first business prospered and he received an increasing number of orders, especially for railway cars. He was doing good business when the panic of 1837 struck the country, causing him years of distress as the bonds he had accepted in lieu of cash for orders became worthless. In 1842, his business finally failed and he lost all his property. He was only able to pay his creditors 50 cents on the dollar.

Undeterred, Stephenson found a new site on West 27th Street, where in 1843 he started to develop a business which eventually covered 16 city lots. Streetcars continued to gain popularity, allowing Stephenson to prosper for the remainder of his life. It was not long before he had fully reimbursed all his creditors and became known as Honest John Stephenson. From 1852 he put all his efforts into building streetcars of various types as their popularity extended to cities throughout the world including, for example, Port Elizabeth, South Africa, Bombay and Caracas. For many years, he was the world's largest builder of streetcars. By the time of his death in 1893, his factory had 500 employees and was producing some 25 cars a week.

As time went by, Stephenson introduced a number of improvements to his streetcars. Perhaps the most important was to reduce the weight from 6,800 pounds to just 3,500 pounds, allowing just two rather than four horses to pull the vehicle. He achieved this by using hickory or ash instead of oak and adding larger windows rather than wood. He placed seats along the sides of the vehicle and used a single rear entrance rather than doors along the side.

He also devised many other improvements in rail car design and was successful in filing at least 11 patents in his own name. It is estimated that the John Stephenson Company made some 25,000 cars in the period 1876–1891 alone and an untold number over the life of the company.
