= Thomas G. Labrecque =

American businessman (1938–2000)

- Born: September 17, 1938; Long Branch, New Jersey
- Died: 16 October 2000 (aged 62); New York City, New York
- Education: Villanova University (BBA), American University (MBA), New York University Stern School of Business (Ph.D.)
- Occupations: Former president and COO (1981-1990), former chairman and CEO (1990-1996), former president and COO (1996-1999) Chase Manhattan Bank

Thomas G. Labrecque served as a former president, CEO, and COO of Chase Manhattan Bank.

== Life ==
Labrecque, the third child of eight, was born to Theodore J. Labrecque, a New Jersey Superior Court judge of French Canadian descent and Marjorie Labrecque. He attended Villanova University and graduated in 1960 and later went to the pursue his graduate studies at the Kogod School of Business of American University and the New York University Stern School of Business. Before beginning his banking career he decided to join The United States Navy and serve four years, rising to the rank of lieutenant. During his service, Labrecque spent time serving on a destroyer at Guantanamo Bay in 1960, in the Mediterranean and Baltic Sea during the building of the Berlin Wall, and also during the Cuban Missile Crisis where he headed a section of the Office of Naval Intelligence, marshaling ships in the blockade off Cuba.

== Career ==
In 1964, Labrecque entered the management training program at Chase Manhattan Bank and quickly made his way up. By 1976 he was appointed to Chase's management committee when he was only 38, making him ten years younger than any other member. During this stage point in the committee at the request of David Rockefeller (the Chief Executive during this period), Labrecque served to resolve the financial crisis at the time. In 1981, Labrecque made it to president and CEO of Chase Manhattan Bank.

By 1990, Chase bank was suffering from defaults on loans to real estate developers and less-developed countries. To settle that, the board looked to Labrecque to solve the issue and named him CEO and Chairman of the bank. In turning around the bank he divested the company's underperforming businesses and boosted profits in core divisions such as credit cards, trust and custody, and mortgage banking. And in 1996 he orchestrated Chase Manhattan Bank's $11 billion merger deal with Chemical Bank. As part of the merger agreement, Labrecque agreed to relinquish his position to Chemical's Chairman and CEO, Walter V. Shipley and return to president and COO of the merged entities.

During the rest of Labrecque's time, he was the key person from the bank who coped with Russia's loan default and he was also pivotal in negotiations to restructure the hedge fund, Long-Term Capital Management. In June 1999 he had stepped down to retirement. Afterward, he served as the Chairman of Chase's International Advisory Council, a Director of Pfizer and Delphi Automotive Systems, and on the Board of Trustees of the University of Notre Dame.

In September 2000, Labrecque was diagnosed with lung cancer, though he did not smoke and was in good health prior. Only a month later in October, he died at Memorial Sloan Kettering Cancer Center. He was survived by his wife, Sheila; four children, Thomas Jr., Douglas, Karen Shea, and Barbara Corbin; five grandchildren; three brothers; and four sisters.

== Other works ==
The J.P. Morgan Thomas G. Labrecque Smart Start Program, which as of 2025 annually offers 10 New York City students a full-tuition scholarship, four years of rotational internships, a mentoring network and professional assistance at any of 12 NYC universities and colleges, was originally created by Labrecque in 1992.

The Thomas G. Labrecque Foundation was founded by the Labrecque family in 2003 in memory of their lost beloved. As part of the foundation, the Thomas G. Labrecque Classic "Run as One" event was launched by family members and friends to raise awareness and donations to fund research for finding a cure for lung cancer, raising up to $10 million as of March 2024.

Business positions
Preceded by Willard C. Butcher	Chase CEO; 1981-1991	Succeeded by Walter V. Shipley
