= Chemical Bank =

Former bank based in New York City

- Chemical's logo, adopted from Manufacturers Hanover after the banks' merger
- Industry: Bank holding company
- Founded: 1824; 202 years ago
- Founder: Balthazar P. Melick
- Defunct: 1996
- Fate: Acquired Chase Bank in 1996 and assumed the Chase name
- Successor: JPMorgan Chase
- Headquarters: New York City
- Key people: Walter V. Shipley (chairman, CEO); William B. Harrison Jr. (vice chairman); John Francis McGillicuddy (director)
- Products: Financial services
- Total assets: ▲$182.9 billion (1995)
- Number of employees: 39,078 (1995)

Chemical Bank, headquartered in New York City, was the principal operating subsidiary of Chemical Banking Corporation, a bank holding company. In 1996, it acquired Chase Bank, adopted the Chase name, and became the largest bank in the United States. Prior to the 1996 merger, Chemical was the third-largest bank in the U.S., with $182.9 billion in assets and more than 39,000 employees. In addition to operations in the U.S., it had a major presence in Japan, Germany, and the United Kingdom. It was active in corporate banking as well as retail banking and investment banking and underwriting corporate bonds and equity.

The bank was founded in 1824 as a subsidiary of the New York Chemical Manufacturing Company by Balthazar P. Melick and others; the manufacturing operations were sold by 1851. Major acquisitions by the bank included Corn Exchange Bank in 1954, Texas Commerce Bank in 1987, and Manufacturers Hanover in 1991. The bank converted to the holding company format in 1968.

== Operations ==
Before its 1996 merger with Chase, Chemical had two operating segments: the Global Bank and Consumer & Relationship Banking.

- Global Bank The Global Bank served the bank's large corporate clients and was made up of a traditional investment banking division, known as Global Banking & Investment Banking, as well as a market maker division, known as Global Markets. Global Banking & Investment Banking performed advisory services such as mergers and acquisitions and corporate restructurings as well as capital raising functions, such as leveraged loan syndication, high yield debt, and other debt and equity underwriting. The bank's private equity and venture capital functions were also housed in this division. Global Markets was primarily focused on sales and trading activities, foreign exchange market dealing, financial derivatives trading and structuring, risk management, and other market-related functions. Chemicals Global Bank roughly balanced its revenue in 1995 between investment banking and markets activities.
- Consumer & Relationship Banking. The Consumer and Relationship Banking division offered consumer banking, commercial banking, credit cards, mortgage loans, home equity loans, and student loans. It was a major lender to middle-market companies nationally and to small businesses in the New York metropolitan area. This division also included a small private banking business, although Chemical was not a leading player in this market.

== History ==
=== Founding and early history ===
Presidents of Chemical Bank
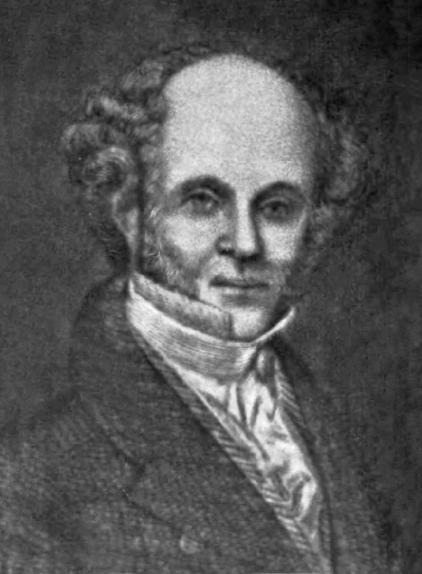
Balthazar P. "Baltus" Melick, founder and first president of Chemical Bank (1824–1831)

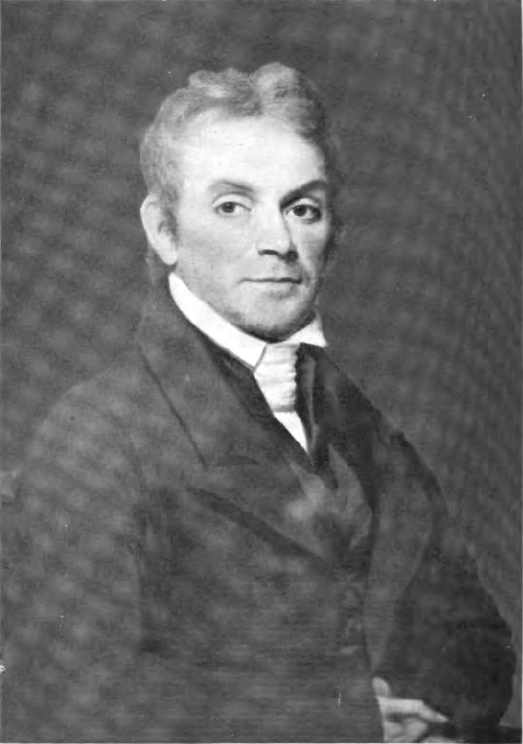
John Mason, early shareholder and second president of Chemical Bank (1831–1839)

Isaac Jones, third president of Chemical Bank (1839–1844)

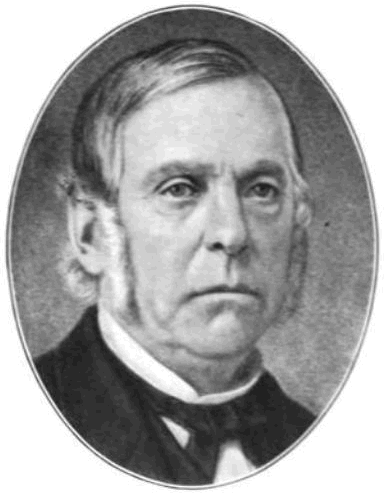
John Q. Jones, fourth president of Chemical Bank (1844–1878)

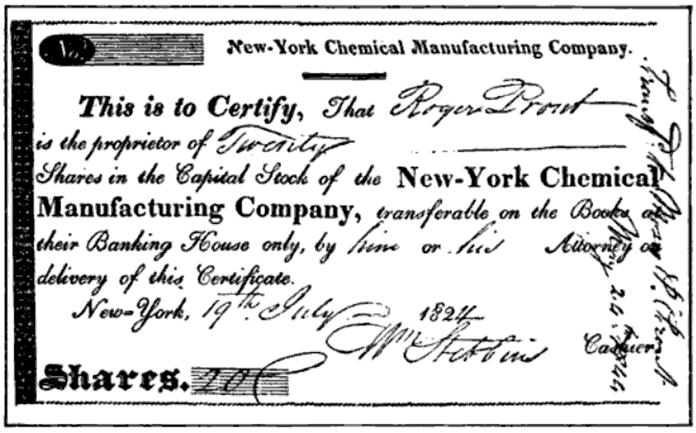
Certificate of Stock of the Chemical Manufacturing Company, c. 1824

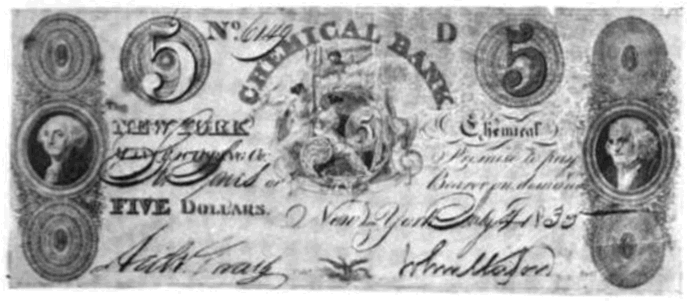
Chemical Bank $5 note, c. 1835

In 1823, the New York Chemical Manufacturing Company was founded by Balthazar P. Melick and directors John C. Morrison, Mark Spenser, Gerardus Post, James Jenkins, William A. Seely, and William Stebbins. Additionally, Joseph Sampson, although not a director, was among the largest of the original shareholders of the later bank. During the 1820s, prospective bankers found that they were more likely to be able to successfully secure a state bank charter if the bank was part of a larger business. Accordingly, the founders used the manufacturing company (which produced chemicals such as blue vitriol, alum, nitric acid, camphor, and saltpeter, as well as medicines, paints, and dyes) as a means of securing a charter from the New York State legislature. In April 1824, the company amended its charter to allow Chemical to enter into banking, creating a separate division for the new activity. Melick was named the first president of the bank, which catered to merchants in New York City. Early investments by the bank were the Erie Canal and new roads.

In 1826, John Mason, one of the richest merchants in New York, became a shareholder of the bank. Mason succeeded Baltus Melick in 1831 as president. Mason was responsible for leading Chemical through the Panic of 1837. When a speculative bubble collapsed on May 10, 1837, banks suspended payment of gold and silver specie (coin). Although Chemical followed other banks in suspending payments during the 1837 crisis, it was one of the earliest to resume payments in specie. Mason served as president until his death in 1839.

Isaac Jones, Mason's son-in-law, then took over. In 1844, when New York Chemical Manufacturing Company's original charter expired, the chemical company was liquidated and was reincorporated as a bank only, taking advantage of the Free Banking Act of 1838 and becoming the Chemical Bank of New York in 1844.

By 1851, the company had sold all remaining inventories from the chemical division as well as the corresponding real estate holdings.

During the Panic of 1857, Chemical continued to make payments in specie even as 18 New York banks closed in a single day. For a few days, it was the only bank to redeem notes in gold instead of in loan certificates. This led to the bank's moniker of, "Old Bullion." The panic, which had hit banks and caused a number of failures, led banks across the country to suspend specie payments and turn to issuing paper promissory notes. Chemical's decision was highly unpopular among its fellow banks and led to the bank's temporary suspension from the New York Clearing House, of which Chemical was a charter member since 1853. Chemical developed a reputation for stability. This reputation was extremely important for Chemical's growth during the recessions of the 1860s.

In 1865, after the passage of the National Bank Act, Chemical received its national charter as the Chemical National Bank of New York, at the urging of the secretary of the treasury. This allowed Chemical to issue government-backed national bank notes, the forerunner to paper money. In 1857, the bank had deposits of $1.6 million, which grew to $3.5 million in 1861 and to $5.1 million by 1871. Among the bank's first directors under its new charter were Cornelius Roosevelt, John D. Wolfe, Isaac Platt, and Bradish Johnson, as well as bank president John Q. Jones.

By December 1873, the bank had 35 employees, including eleven tellers, eight clerks, and four bookkeepers.

Isaac Jones's cousin, John Quentin Jones, led Chemical through 1878. The Mason and Jones families maintained effective control of Chemical for much of its first 50 years.

John Q. Jones was succeeded in 1878 by George G. Williams, who had joined the bank in 1842 and served as cashier of the bank from 1855 onward. In that position, Williams was also inculcated in Chemical's conservative style of banking. Williams served as president from 1878 through 1903.

=== 1900–1946 ===
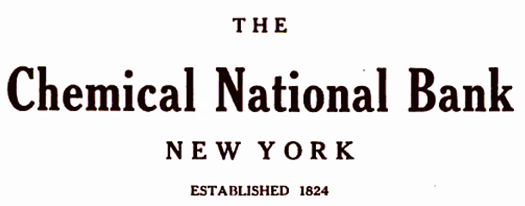
The 1917-1924 Chemical National Bank logo

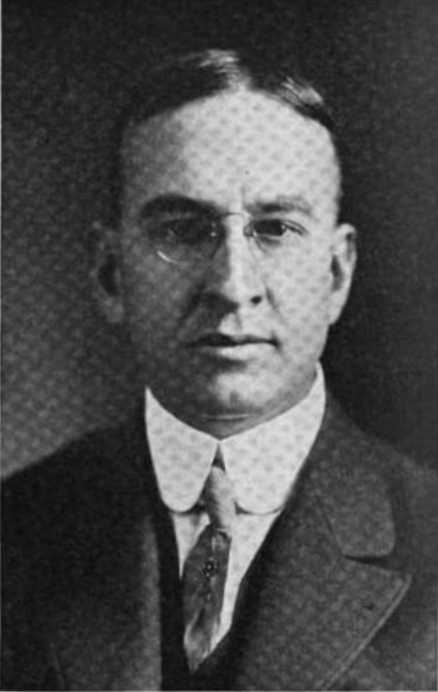
Percy H. Johnston, president of Chemical 1920–1946, responsible for building Chemical into one of the largest U.S. banks

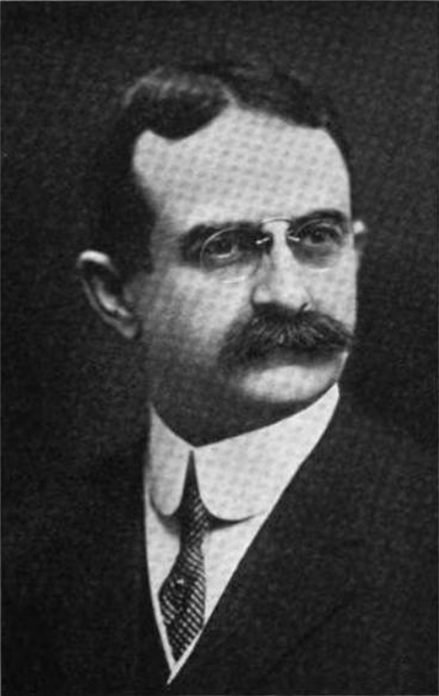
Herbert K. Twitchell, president of Chemical 1917–1920, and responsible for initiating major changes at the bank

By the 1900s, Chemical had one of the strongest reputations in banking, but as a business, it was in decline, losing accounts each year. Unlike many of its peers, Chemical had been reluctant to expand into securities and other businesses and had not paid interest on bank accounts. Both practices, considered to be highly conservative, had allowed Chemical to develop a large capital reserve but were not attracting customers. William H. Porter, a prominent banker of the era, was named president of the bank in 1903 after the death of the previous president, George G. Williams. Porter left Chemical seven years later to become a partner at J.P. Morgan & Co. in 1910 and was succeeded by Joseph B. Martindale, who was named president in 1911.

In 1917, Chemical named a new president of the bank, Herbert Twitchell, after the death of Joseph B. Martindale. Months after Martindale's death, it was discovered that he had stolen as much as $300,000 from the account of Ellen D. Hunt, a niece of Wilson G. Hunt.

Twitchell initiated a major turnaround of Chemical, setting up a trust business and reversing Chemical's policy of not paying interest on cash accounts. These steps, along with other initiatives, resulted in an increase in deposits from $35 million in September 1917 to $63 million in December 1917 to $81 million by 1920. In 1920, Twitchell was succeeded by Percy H. Johnston, then aged 39, and remained with the bank as chairman of the board. Johnston served as the bank's president until 1946, during which the bank expanded to rank seventh in the U.S.

In 1920, Chemical completed its first major acquisition, merging with Citizens National Bank. The acquisition of Citizens National, a small New York commercial bank, increased Chemical's assets to more than $200 million with more than $140 million of deposits. In 1923, Chemical established its first branch and by the end of the 1920s had opened a dozen branches in Manhattan and Brooklyn as well as a branch in London, its first international presence.

In 1929, Chemical reincorporated as a state bank in New York as Chemical Bank & Trust Company and merged with the United States Mortgage & Trust Company, headquartered on Madison Avenue and 74th Street. During the Great Depression, Chemical's deposits grew by more than 40%, and in 1941, the bank reached $1 billion of assets. During this period, Chemical also established Chemical National Company, a securities underwriting business.

=== 1947–1979 ===
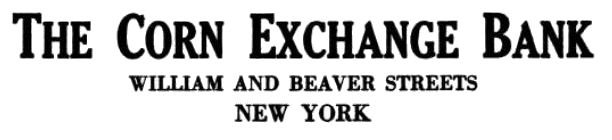
The Corn Exchange Bank, acquired in 1954, expanded the bank's branch network.

The New York Trust Company merged in 1959 increasing the bank's wholesale banking business.

In 1947, after the retirement of Percy Johnston, Harold Holmes Helm was named the president of Chemical and served first as president and later as chairman of the bank for the next 18 years until his retirement in 1965. In 1947, Chemical merged with Continental Bank and Trust Company.

In 1954, Chemical merged with the Corn Exchange Bank in its largest acquisition to date, becoming the Chemical Corn Exchange Bank. Founded in 1853, the Corn Exchange Bank, based in New York City, had built a network of 98 branches in several states and $774 million in deposits through the acquisition of community banks.

In 1959, the bank merged with New York Trust Company, effectively doubling the size of the company. New York Trust Company, which had a large trust and wholesale-banking business, specialized in servicing large industrial accounts. At the time of the merger, Chemical Corn was the fourth largest bank in New York, and New York Trust was the ninth largest bank, and the merger created the third largest bank in New York and the fourth largest in the U.S. with $3.8 billion of assets. Following the merger, the bank dropped the usage of the "corn exchange" from the corporate name to become the Chemical Bank New York Trust Company.

Throughout the early 1960s, Chemical had begun to expand into New York's suburbs, opening branches on Long Island and in Westchester County.

In early 1968, the bank acquired L. F. Dommerich, a factoring company.

In November 1968, Chemical reorganized itself as a bank holding company, Chemical New York Corporation, which allowed for more rapid expansion.

In the late 1960s and early 1970s, Chemical opened new offices in Frankfurt, Germany (1969); Zurich, Switzerland (1971); Brussels, Belgium (1971); Paris, France (1971); and Tokyo, Japan (1972). In 1970, it formed a venture in London focused on Eurocurrency financing.

In 1975, Chemical acquired Security National Bank, which had a 96-branch network on Long Island, for $40 million in cash.

=== 1980s ===
Chemical Bank's 1970-1992 logo, in use until the bank's merger with Manufacturers Hanover

Throughout the 1980s, Chemical continued pursuing acquisitions, notably its acquisitions of Texas Commerce Bank and Horizon Bancorp in 1986 and its attempted takeover of Florida National Bank in 1982.

Chemical and Florida National Bank agreed, in 1982, to enter into a merger after laws preventing interstate banking were lifted, giving Chemical an option to acquire the business. In February 1982, Southeast Banking Corporation (SBC), which had been rebuffed in its attempt to acquire Florida National, sued to obtain an injunction against the Chemical merger. In early 1983, Southeast Banking Corporation dropped its takeover attempt and agreed to exchange their Florida National shares for 24 FNB branch offices and other consideration. Following the deal with SBC, Florida National was cleared to merge with Chemical; however, interstate banking acquisitions were still prohibited by federal law and required state legislative approval. With the 1990 deadline running out for its option to buy Florida National and no sign of state legislative approval, Chemical Bank sold its 4.9% interest to First Union for $115 million.

In 1983, the bank sold its stock transfer agent business to Harris Bancorp.

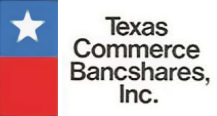
Texas Commerce Bank, acquired by Chemical in 1986 in the largest interstate banking merger at that time

In December 1986, the bank agreed to acquire Texas Commerce Bank for $1.1 billion in the largest interstate banking merger in U.S. history to that time; the transaction was completed in May 1987. Texas Commerce was one of the largest bank holding companies in the Southwestern U.S., with a strong presence in corporate banking for small and medium-sized businesses. Ultimately, Chemical contributed $300 million to shore up Texas Commerce as it continued to suffer losses.

Chemical agreed to merge with New Jersey-based Horizon Bancorp in 1986, but interstate banking rules delayed the merger until 1989.

The bank's holding company, Chemical New York Corporation, was renamed the Chemical Banking Corporation in 1988 following its series of out-of-state mergers and acquisitions, including Texas Commerce Bank and Horizon Bancorp.

In the 1980s and early 1990s, Chemical became one of the leaders in the financing of leveraged buyout transactions. By the late 1980s, Chemical developed its reputation for financing buyouts, building a syndicated leveraged finance business and related advisory businesses under the auspices of pioneering investment banker Jimmy Lee. It was not until 1993 that Chemical received permission to underwrite corporate bonds; however, within a few years, Chemical (and later Chase) became a major underwriter of below-investment-grade debt under Lee. Additionally, in 1984, Chemical launched Chemical Venture Partners to invest in private equity transactions alongside various financial sponsors.

=== 1990s ===
In July 1991, Chemical announced the acquisition of Manufacturers Hanover Corporation in a $135 billion merger transaction. At the time of the merger, Chemical and Manufacturers Hanover were the sixth and ninth largest banks, respectively, by assets. The transaction, when it closed at the end of 1991, made the combined bank, which retained the Chemical name, the second largest bank in the U.S., behind Citicorp, both in terms of assets and customers, with approximately 1.2 million household accounts in 1991. Chemical adopted Manufacturers Hanover's logo design and moved into its headquarters at 270 Park Avenue in New York. The "Manny Hanny" name was eliminated in 1993. In corporate banking, Manufacturers Hanover was better established with larger, blue-chip companies, whereas Chemical had been stronger with small- and medium-sized businesses. Nationally, the combined Chemical Bank became one of the largest lenders to U.S. companies and one of the leaders in loan syndication globally. Additionally, Chemical took a leading role in providing foreign exchange, interest rate and currency swaps, corporate finance services, cash management, corporate and institutional trust, trade services, and funds transfer. Chemical operated one of the nation's largest bank credit card franchises and was a major originator and servicer of home mortgages.

In 1994, the bank closed 50 branches in the New York metropolitan area and laid off 650 people.

In 1996, Chemical acquired Chase Bank in a merger valued at $10 billion, creating the largest financial institution in the United States. Although Chemical was the acquiring company and the nominal survivor, the merged bank adopted the Chase name, which was considered to be better known, particularly internationally. Chase, which at its height had been the largest bank in the U.S., had fallen to sixth, while Chemical was the third-largest bank at the time of the merger. The merger resulted in the reduction of more than 12,000 jobs between the two banks and merger-related expenses of approximately $1.9 billion.

The bank continued to operate under the Chase brand until its acquisition of J.P. Morgan & Co. in December 2000 to form JPMorgan Chase. Throughout all of these acquisitions, Chemical's original management team, led by Walter V. Shipley, remained in charge of the bank. When the combined bank purchased J.P. Morgan & Co., William B. Harrison Jr., who had been a longtime Chemical executive, was named CEO of the combined firm. Chemical's private equity group was renamed CCMP Capital; the bank completed the corporate spin-off of the division in 2006 after it acquired Bank One in 2004. JPMorgan Chase retains Chemical's pre-1996 stock price history, as well as Chemical's old headquarters location at 270 Park Avenue(the building itself was replaced in the 2020s).

=== Acquisition history ===
Major mergers, acquisitions, and historical predecessors of Chemical Bank

The Chemical Bank of New York established 1823
Citizens National Bank established 1851 acquired 1920	Corn Exchange Bank established 1852 acquired 1954
Texas Commerce Bank established 1866 acquired 1986
Hanover Bank established 1873
Manufacturers Trust Company established 1905
Manufacturers Hanover merged 1961
Chemical Banking Corporation reorganized 1988
Chemical Bank merged 1991

=== Electronic banking history ===
Chemical was among the pioneers of electronic online banking. On September 2, 1969, Chemical installed the first automated teller machine (ATM) at its branch in Rockville Centre, New York. The first ATMs were designed to dispense a fixed amount of cash when a user inserted a specially coded card. A Chemical Bank advertisement boasted, "On Sept. 2 our bank will open at 9:00 and never close again." Chemical's ATM, initially known as a Docuteller, was designed by Donald Wetzel and his company Docutel. Chemical executives were initially hesitant about the electronic banking transition given the high cost of the early machines. Additionally, executives were concerned that customers would resist having machines handle their money.

In 1982, Chemical initiated the first personal computer–based banking system when it launched a pilot electronic banking program called Pronto. Chemical had spent $20 million to develop the software for Pronto. The system, which worked with the Atari 8-bit computer, began in New York and served 200 Chemical Bank customers. Pronto was an extension of other electronic banking services offered by Chemical that included a corporate cash-management system and its growing ATM network and was one of the largest early forays by a bank into home computer–based banking. However, a year after launching Pronto, only 21,000 of Chemical's 1.15 million customers were using the system, in large part due to the high monthly subscription costs that Chemical charged customers to use it. By 1985, it was clear that Pronto, which was heavily promoted by Chemical, was growing much slower than anticipated.

In 1985, Chemical and BankAmerica, another pioneer in electronic banking, entered into a joint venture with AT&T and Time Inc., known as Covidea, to market banking and discount stock-brokerage services to computer-equipped households. By combining resources and sharing costs, the four firms hoped to reduce the risk of large and protracted losses. Eventually Chemical discontinued its efforts in 1989 at a loss of nearly $30 million.

=== Offices history ===
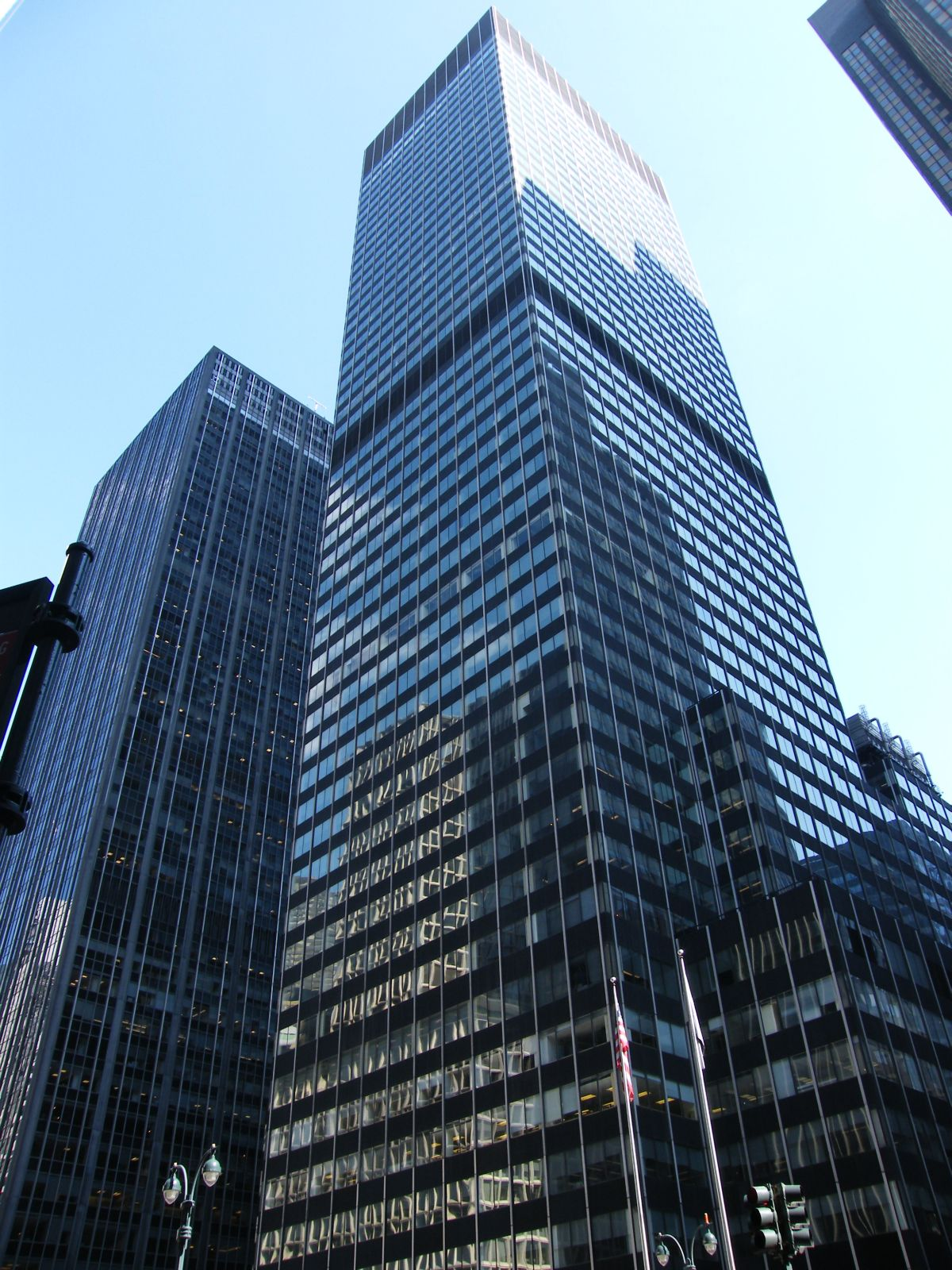
Chemical's offices at 277 Park Avenue from 1979 until its 1991 merger with Manufacturers Hanover Corporation, when the bank moved across the street

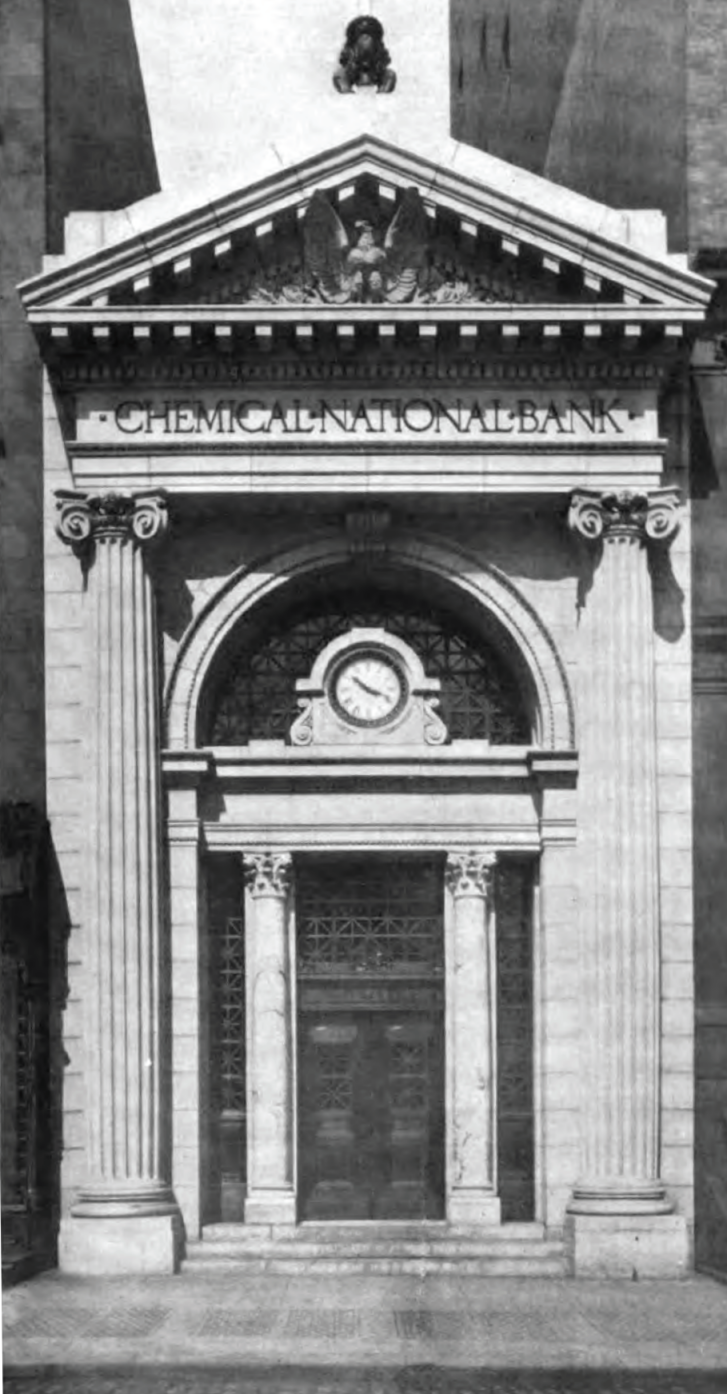
Chemical National Bank offices at 270 Broadway, c. 1913

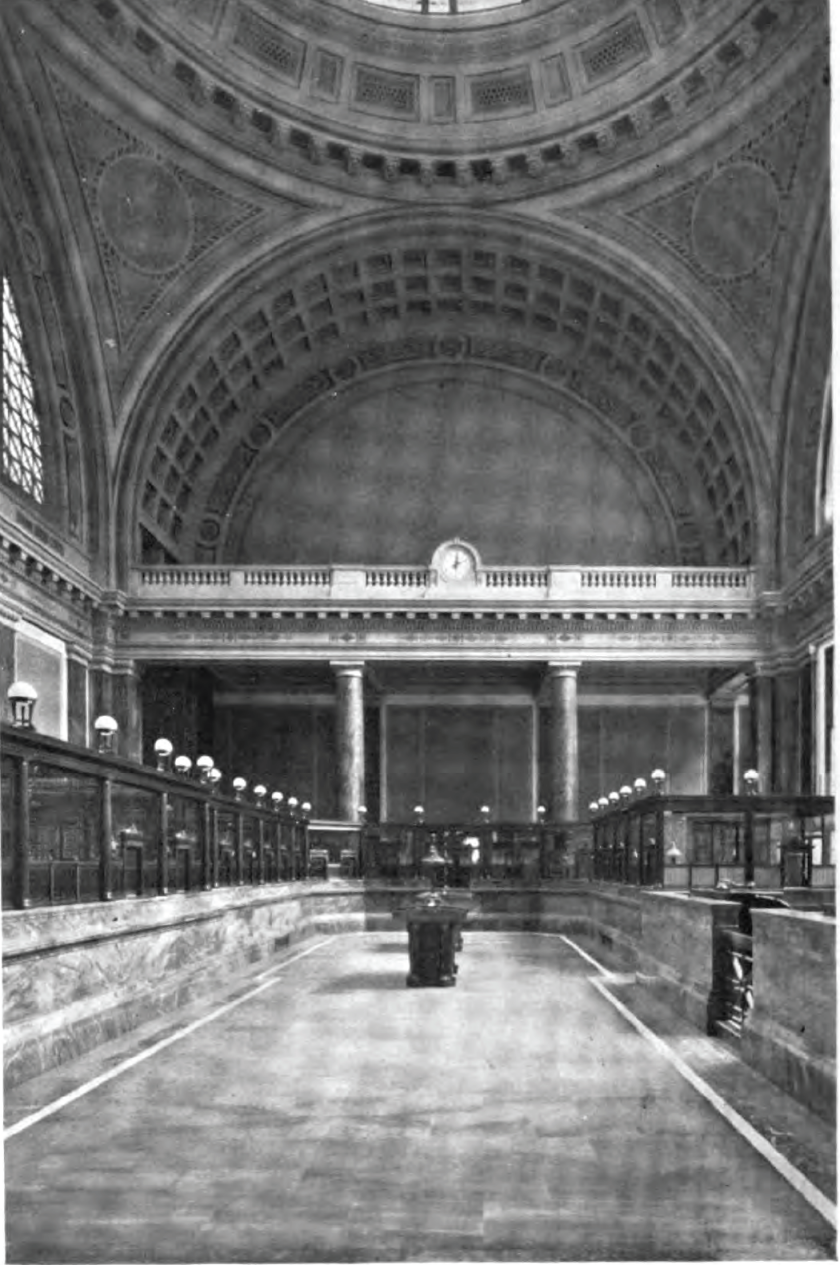
Interior of Chemical National Bank offices at 270 Broadway, c. 1913

In 1824, the bank opened its first offices at 216 Broadway in Lower Manhattan at the corner of Ann Street. In 1848, the bank agreed to sell its building to its neighbor, Barnum's American Museum. The building collapsed during Barnum's subsequent remodeling. In 1850, the bank moved into its newly constructed headquarters at 270 Broadway. Chemical bought additional land next to its building in 1879 and 1887, but its offices remained modest through the start of the 20th century.

In 1907, the bank constructed a new headquarters on the original and adjacent properties at 270 Broadway, designed by architect Goodhue Livingston of Trowbridge & Livingston. In 1921, Chemical acquired the adjacent 13-story building from the Shoe & Leather Bank. Despite expanding its 1907 headquarters over the years, by the mid-1920s, Chemical needed more space to accommodate its growth and reflect its increasing profile.

In 1926, the bank constructed a six-story building at 165 Broadway, on the corner of Broadway and Cortlandt Street, closer to the Financial District. Chemical moved in after the building was completed in 1928, and the bank's headquarters remained there for more than 50 years.

Under Chairman Donald Platten, in 1979, Chemical moved its headquarters to 277 Park Avenue.

In 1991, the bank moved across Park Avenue to occupy the former headquarters of Manufacturers Hanover Corporation at 270 Park Avenue, which remained the headquarters of Chemical's successor, JPMorgan Chase, until the building was vacated in 2018 in preparation for demolition and construction of a new JPMorgan Chase headquarters on the same site. JPMorgan Chase returned to 277 Park Avenue in 2000, following the departure of its previous tenant, Donaldson Lufkin & Jenrette. In 2008, after JPMorgan acquired Bear Stearns, the bank moved its investment banking groups from Chemical's old headquarters to 383 Madison Avenue. After the old 270 Park Avenue was closed and demolished in 2018, JPMorgan moved its headquarters temporarily to 383 Madison Avenue; the headquarters was scheduled to be relocated to a new tower at 270 Park Avenue upon completion of the structure, scheduled in 2025.

== Notable employees and executives ==
=== Executives and directors ===
- William B. Harrison Jr. (1943-), later CEO of JPMorgan Chase
- James B. Lee Jr. (1952–2015), investment banker and senior executive at JPMorgan Chase, notable for his role in the development of the leveraged finance markets in the U.S., began his career at the bank in 1975
- Robert I. Lipp, partner of Brysam Global Partners, a private equity firm, and former member of the board of JPMorgan Chase
- John McGillicuddy (1930–2009), former chairman and CEO of Manufacturers Hanover, organized the merger.
- John Mason (1773–1839), early shareholder and second president of Chemical Bank
- Balthazar P. Melick (1770–1835), founder and first president of Chemical Bank
- John L. Notter (1935-), international financier and developer, former director
- Cornelius Roosevelt (1794–1871), original director of Chemical Bank of New York when it was rechartered in 1844
- Emlen Roosevelt (1857–1930), cousin of Theodore Roosevelt and president of Roosevelt & Son, worked at the bank for 2 years
- James A. Roosevelt, uncle of Theodore Roosevelt and founder of Roosevelt & Son, hired in 1890
- Earl C. Sandmeyer, a founder of the New York Society of Security Analysts, the New York Financial Writers Association, the International Public Relations Association (IPRA), the Public Relations Society, the Public Relations Society of America, the Public Utilities Advertising Association, the Newcomen Society, Christ Church Day School, Corporate Intelligence, Inc. public relations and publishing, and Lifelighters' Associates record company; the financial editor of the Rochester Times-Union from 1929 to 1933; the financial editor and columnist of the Gannett newspapers in Rochester from 1933 to 1938; and a financial writer for the New York Herald Tribune from 1938 to 1940.
- Walter V. Shipley (1935–2019), former chairman and CEO of Chemical and later Chase Bank and chairman of JPMorgan Chase, worked at the bank since 1983

=== Other former employees ===
- Henry B. R. Brown, the originator of the world's first money market fund, worked for the bank in the 1950s
- Granger K. Costikyan, founder of Costikyan Freres
- Alan H. Fishman, the last CEO of Washington Mutual before the bank was seized in 2008, worked for the bank for 19 years before resigning in 1987
- Ford M. Fraker, former ambassador to Saudi Arabia, worked at the bank from 1972 to 1979
- Christopher C. Ashby, former ambassador to Uruguay, worked with the bank since 1973
- Abraham George, businessman, academic, philanthropist, and founder of The George Foundation
- Glenn Hutchins, founder of Silver Lake Partners, started his career at Chemical Bank in 1977
- Kathryn V. Marinello, former president and CEO of Ceridian Corporation
- Darla Moore, business partner and wife of Richard Rainwater
- Nancy Naples, director of Amtrak
- Peggy Post, American author and consultant on etiquette, underwent management training at Chemical Bank
- Pat Toomey, United States senator from Pennsylvania, began his career at the bank
- Kathleen Waldron, an American author, financial executive and educator, later president of Baruch College
