= Sandy Warner =

Sandy Warner may refer to:

- Sandra Warner (1934–2022), American model, actress, and singer
- Douglas A. Warner III (born 1946), American businessman who led the 2000 sale of J P Morgan to Chase Manhattan Bank
