= Judith Kent =

American business executive and philanthropist (born 1956)

- Born: Judith Ellen Kent; 1956 (age 69–70); Bethesda, Maryland, U.S.
- Education: Tulane University (BA); Catholic University of America (MA); Harvard University (MBA)
- Occupations: Business executive, philanthropist
- Spouse: Jamie Dimon (m. 1983)
- Children: 3

Judith Ellen Kent (born 1956) is an American business executive and philanthropist with a background in organizational psychology and marketing. She has held roles in corporate management and philanthropy, and is involved in charitable initiatives through the James and Judith K. Dimon Foundation.

== Early life and education ==
Kent was born in 1956 in Bethesda, Maryland, to a Jewish family. Her father, Robert Kent, was a businessman who held interests in insurance and real estate through his company, Kent Companies, based in Rockville, Maryland.

Kent attended Tulane University for her undergraduate studies, where she developed an interest in business. Following her undergraduate degree, she pursued a master's degree in organizational psychology at the Catholic University of America. Kent attended Harvard Business School, where she completed an MBA. During her time at Harvard, she met Jamie Dimon, who would become her husband.

== Career ==
Kent's career began at Shearson, a financial services firm where she was initially a management trainee. She advanced within the company, eventually becoming vice president of marketing after its acquisition by American Express. Following the birth of her first child, Kent transitioned from her corporate role to focus on philanthropy. She took on the role of executive director at a foundation supporting economically disadvantaged youth. Kent worked with the Children's Aid Society, an organization that supports educational initiatives in inner-city schools.

Kent has managed the James and Judith K. Dimon Foundation, an organization that supports initiatives in education, youth development, health, and social services. Through the foundation, she focuses on community-focused philanthropic efforts, channeling resources toward underfunded sectors.

In November 2024, Kent participated in canvassing efforts in Lansing, Michigan, to support the Kamala Harris 2024 presidential campaign, citing the election's stakes for national "core principles, security, and the economy." Her involvement represented a more direct approach than her prior financial contributions, as high-dollar donors rarely engage in door-to-door canvassing.

== Personal life ==
In 1983, Kent married Jamie Dimon in a ceremony led by a rabbi, fulfilling a compromise, as Kent's family had hoped Dimon would convert to Judaism, but he declined. The couple has three daughters. Over the years, Dimon has credited Kent with providing stability and support throughout his career in finance.
