= Donald Wetzel =

American businessman (born 1929)

Donald C. Wetzel (born January 3, 1929) is an American businessman known for holding the USA patent to the automatic teller machine.

Born in New Orleans, Louisiana, he graduated from Jesuit High School (New Orleans) in 1947 and got a B.Sc. in foreign trade from Loyola University New Orleans (1951). He was also a professional in minor-league baseball for the New York Giants farm system (1948–50), and began working for IBM in his hometown (1951–55) before moving to Fort Worth, Texas as branch manager (1955) and as consultant to the banking industry in San Antonio (1956–1963) and Houston (1963–65).

His engineering fame came while working as vice president of the Docutel Corporation of Irving, Texas which he joined in 1968. He designed the Docuteller machine (1968) that was first deployed at Chemical Bank in New York City in 1969 and was patented in 1973. Later he founded three financial systems companies, the Financial Systems & Equipment Corporation (1973), Electronic Banking Systems, Inc. (1979) and Autosig Systems, Inc. (1982) from which he retired in 1989, still living in Dallas.

== Awards ==
- IEEE Simon Ramo Medal (2006)
