= Walter V. Shipley =

American banker (1935–2019)

Walter Shipley
- Born: Walter Vincent Shipley II; November 2, 1935; Newark, New Jersey, U.S.
- Died: January 11, 2019 (aged 83)
- Education: Williams College; New York University (BA)
- Political party: Republican

Walter Vincent Shipley II (November 2, 1935 – January 11, 2019) was the chairman and chief executive officer of Chase Manhattan Bank and, previous to that, the company with which it merged Chemical Bank. Shipley was named chief executive of Chemical in 1981 and held the position through 1999 and remained at the bank as chairman through January 2000, just prior to the bank's merger with J.P. Morgan & Co. During his 18-year tenure, Shipley oversaw Chemical's mergers with Texas Commerce Bank in 1987, Manufacturers Hanover in 1991 and Chase Manhattan Bank in 1996.

== Early life and education ==
Shipley was the son of a Wall Street investment banker who regularly surrounded his wife and five children with visitors from overseas. He attended Williams College to study economics and political science, and at 6’8”, was named captain of the basketball team. However, off the court his grades slipped and he was forced to leave Williams in 1956, during his junior year. He referred to this as a wake-up call that made him determined to prove to his family and friends that "I was better than I had demonstrated up until that time." He joined the New York Trust Company that same year and earned his undergraduate degree from New York University in 1961.

== Career ==
Shipley started his career in the loan department at New York Trust Company in 1956. New York Trust was acquired by Chemical Bank in 1959. By the late 1970s, he was the head of Chemical Bank's international department. He was named executive vice president in 1979, president in 1981, and CEO in 1983, all at Chemical Bank. After Chemical Bank's merger with Manufacturer's Hanover in 1991, he took a lower executive-level position. However, he was renamed as CEO of Chemical Bank in 1994. From 1996 through 1999, Shipley was CEO and chairman of the board of directors at Chase Manhattan, after its merger with Chemical Bank in 1996.

In 1987, Shipley oversaw Chemical Bank's purchase of the Texas Commerce Bank in Houston. Initially, Texas Commerce incurred big losses for Chemical Bank due to a deteriorating economy in Texas. The acquisition was viewed unfavorably by many executives at Chemical Bank, and Wall Street bankers encouraged Chemical Bank to sell Texas Commerce. However, Texas Commerce was viewed as a "star-jewel" for Chemical Bank by the mid-1990s, according to New York Times journalist Michael Quint.

Throughout his career, Shipley served on the board of directors at several corporations, including; Exxon Mobil, Wyeth, and Verizon.

== Political involvement ==
Shipley participated in several political campaigns, including; Bill Bradley's run to be Democratic nominee for the United States President in 2000. He was also involved on George W. Bush's run for presidency in 2000 and 2004, Mitt Romney's presidential campaigns in 2008 and 2012, and Alphonse D'Amato run for the United States Senate in 1998.

Shipley was a rumored candidate for Secretary of the Treasury in 2000 but was passed over in favor of Paul H. O'Neill.

== Personal life ==
Shipley was the son of noted investment banker Linwood Parks Shipley, a partner in the investment banking firm of Brown Brothers Harriman & Company, and Emily Catherine (Herzog) Shipley. He was married to Judith Lyman Shipley from 1957 until her death in 2014. They had five children including Barbara T. Shipley, Allison P. Shipley, Pamela J. Shipley, Dorothy B. Shipley, and John P. Shipley. At the time of his death, he resided in Summit, New Jersey where he lived from his childhood. Shipley also had 7 grandchildren.

== Philanthropy ==
Shipley was actively involved in many philanthropic organizations. He served as trustee at American Museum of Natural History, Lincoln Center, and Goodwill Industries. He was head of Goodwill's strategic planning committee from 1983 until 2002, when he received Goodwill's Volunteer Leader Award.

Shipley and his wife Judith V. Shipley were major supporters and donors at the Greater Newark Conservancy. The Greater Newark Conservancy named its Urban Environmental Center after Judith Shipley. Shipley and his wife were also supporters of the Summit Speech School and NJPAC.

== Notes ==
Business positions
Preceded by Thomas G. Labrecque	CEO of Chase; 1996–1999	Succeeded by William B. Harrison Jr.
