= John Stephenson Company =

- Company type: Subsidiary
- Industry: Rail transport
- Founded: 1831; 195 years ago
- Defunct: 1917
- Headquarters: New York City, New York, USA
- Area served: Worldwide
- Products: Horsecars and electric streetcars

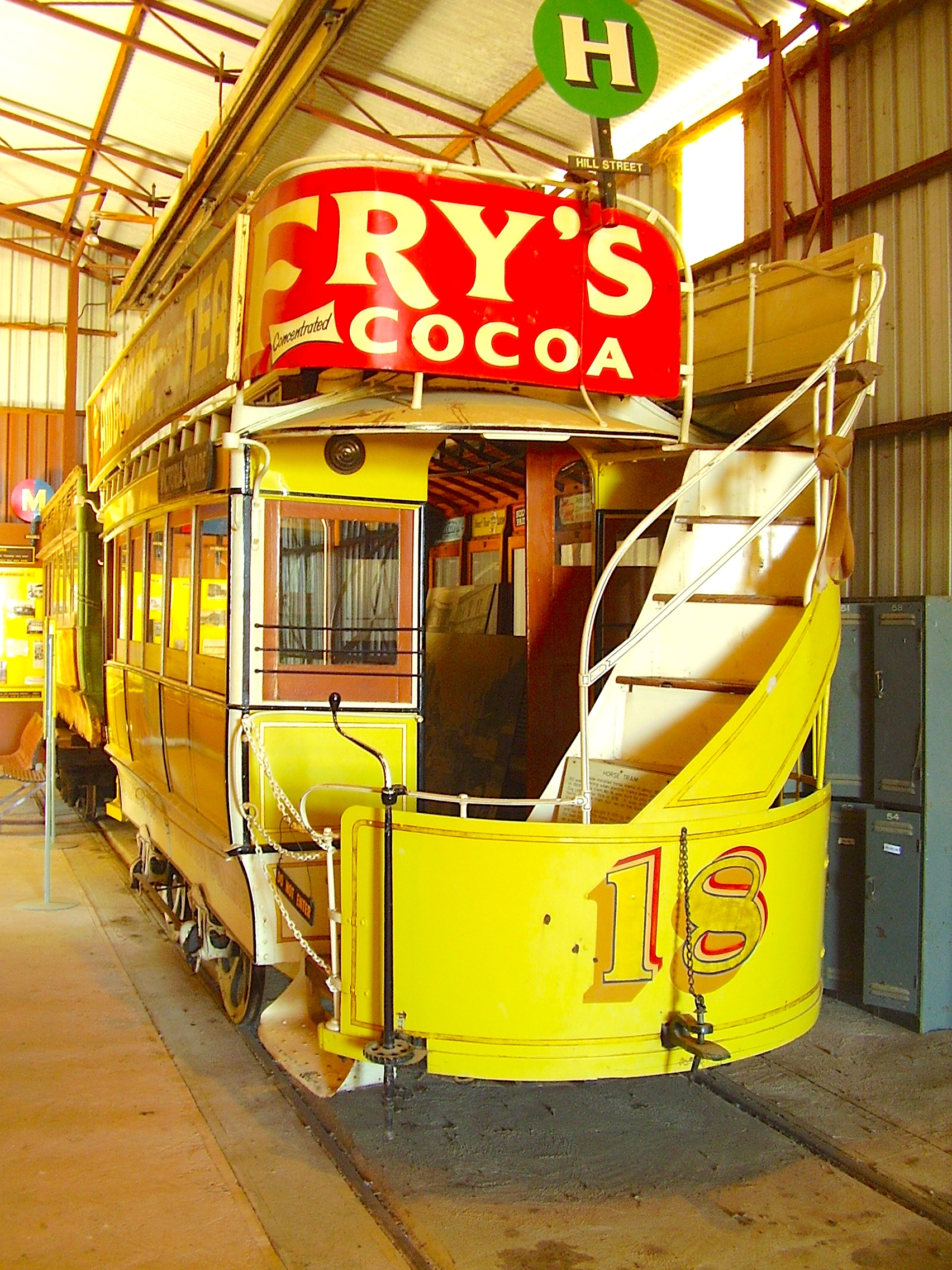
Horse-drawn streetcar, 1878

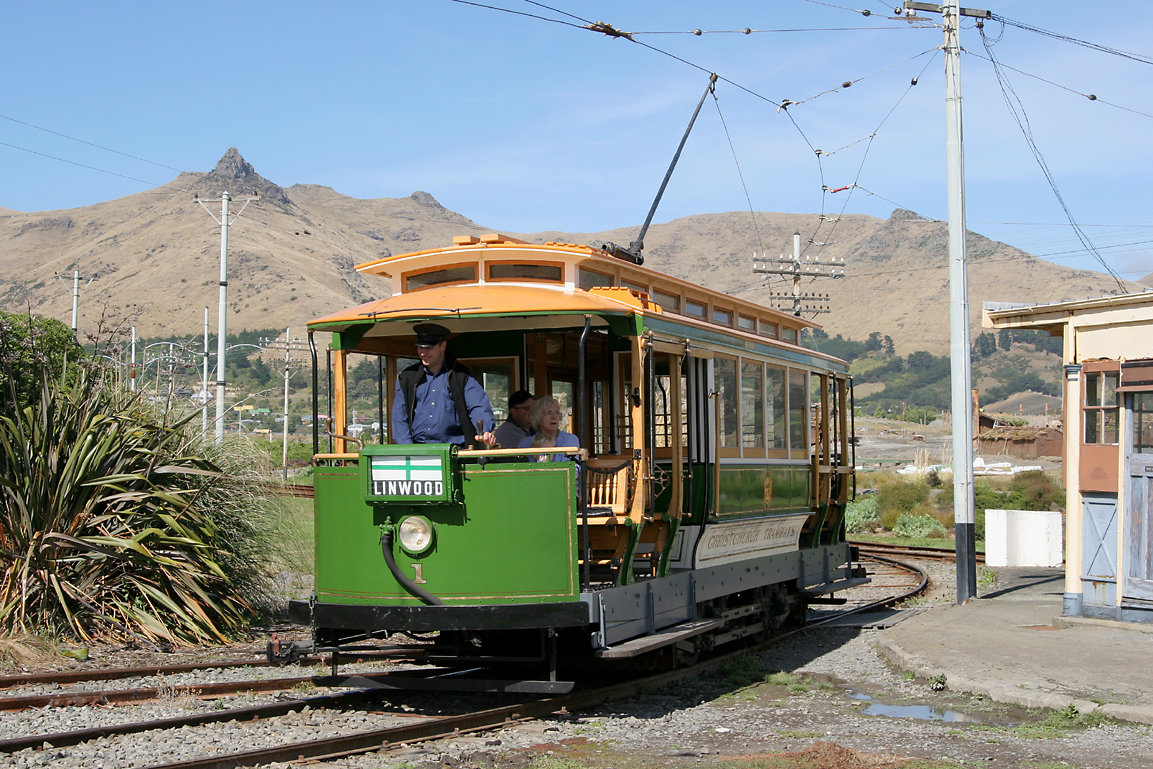
A 1905 John Stephenson-built streetcar at the Ferrymead Heritage Park in New Zealand

The John Stephenson Car Company was an American manufacturer of carriages, horsecars, cable cars, and streetcars, based in New York City. It was founded by John Stephenson in 1831. John Stephenson invented the first streetcar to run on rails, building this in 1832, for the New York and Harlem Railroad. A reorganization in 1867 included shortening of the company's name to the John Stephenson Company. In the latter part of the 19th century, the company was a major builder of streetcars, constructing some 25,000 cars in the period 1876–1891 alone, including ones for export.

Its customers included many systems, in the US and other countries. Among the foreign ones were the Toronto Street Railways, Montreal Street Railway Company, the Halifax Street Railway, Mexico City's Empresa de los Ferrocarriles del Distrito Federal, Lisbon’s CCFL (Carris), and Caracas' Tranvía Caracas and Tranvía Bolívar.

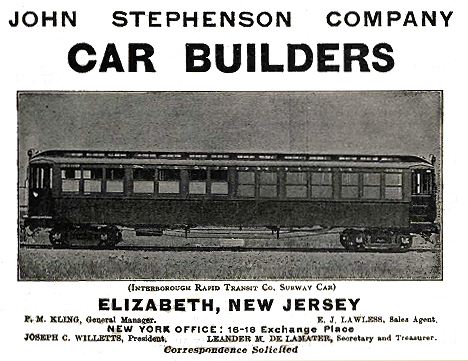
Advertisement from 1903

Stephenson's factory was located in Elizabeth, New Jersey, after 1898. In that year, it completed the construction of a "large factory" on a 117-acre (47 ha) plot of land, The New York Times reported. The company was acquired by the J.G. Brill Company in 1904 and continued to operate under the Stephenson name until 1917, when the plant was sold to the Standard Aero Corporation for production of airplanes, and the corporation was liquidated in 1919.

== See also ==
- List of tram builders
