= Dennis Weatherstone =

British banker (1930–2008)

Dennis Weatherstone KBE
- Born: 29 November 1930; Marylebone, London, England
- Died: 13 June 2008 (aged 77); Darien, Connecticut, United States
- Occupations: Banker and businessman
- Known for: CEO and chairman of J. P. Morgan & Co.

Sir Dennis Weatherstone KBE (29 November 1930 – 13 June 2008) was the former CEO and chairman of J. P. Morgan & Co.

== Biography ==
Born in London, England, Weatherstone attended North Western Polytechnic. In 1946, at the age of 16, he was hired as a bookkeeper and was quickly promoted to the foreign exchange trading desk at the Guaranty Trust Company, a predecessor firm in London. He rose through the ranks, becoming Morgan's chairman and CEO in 1991. He retired from J. P. Morgan in 1995 and was succeeded by Douglas "Sandy" Warner III.

Weatherstone became a vice chairman and director in 1979, chairman of the executive committee a year later and president in 1987. In 1990, he was named chairman and chief executive officer and was knighted by Queen Elizabeth II—the first J.P. Morgan employee to receive the honour.

Later that year, he helped the firm earn Federal Reserve authority to trade and sell corporate stocks, making J. P. Morgan the first bank-related securities firm with a full range of securities powers. A decade later, the Glass–Steagall Act was repealed, allowing banking companies to provide any service, whether it be a loan, advice or a securities offering.

JPMorgan invented value-at-risk (VaR) as a tool for measuring exposure to trading losses. The tool emerged in the wake of the 1987 stock market crash when Weatherstone asked his division chiefs to put together a briefing to answer the question: "How much can we lose on our trading portfolio by tomorrow's close?"

Weatherstone served as an independent member of the Board of Banking Supervision of the Bank of England from 1995 through 2001. He was also a board member of Merck & Co., General Motors and the NYSE, and a director of Air Liquide.

In 1971, he and his wife and children moved to Darien, Connecticut, United States, where he died on 13 June 2008, aged 77.

Business positions
Preceded by Lewis Preston	Chairman of J.P. Morgan & Co. 1991–1995	Succeeded by Douglas A. Warner III
