= Granger K. Costikyan =

American banker

Granger Kent Costikyan (29 March 1907 – 10 March 1998) was an American banker. Granger was educated at Hotchkiss School, graduating in 1925, and Yale University, graduating in 1929. He was a member of the Skull and Bones secret society.

Costikyan was with the New York Trust Company from 1929 to 1959, and became a partner of Brown Brothers Harriman in 1969. He was Vice President of the Chemical Bank of New York, from 1959 to 1962; and Senior Vice President of the First Bank Stock Corporation of Minneapolis, from 1962 to 1969. Costikyan also served as Chairman of the First Bank System of Minneapolis.
