= Willard C. Butcher =

American banker (1926–2012)

Willard Carlisle Butcher (October 25, 1926 – August 25, 2012) was chairman and CEO of Chase Manhattan Bank from 1980 to 1991.

== Early life and education ==
Born October 25, 1926 in Bronxville, NY, Butcher began his higher education in 1944 at Middlebury College in Vermont. Discharged from the U.S. Navy in 1946, he enrolled at Brown University, graduating in 1947 with a B.A. degree, magna cum laude, and as a member of Phi Beta Kappa. He was awarded honorary Doctor of Laws degrees from Brown, Pepperdine and Tulane Universities and an honorary Doctor of Humane Letters from Pace University.

== Career ==
Butcher joined Chase National Bank, predecessor to Chase Manhattan, in 1947 and spent his early career in Chase’s midtown Manhattan branch system. He later headed Chase’s retail and corporate business for midtown and moved to the international department in 1969, where he headed operations in Europe and sub-Saharan Africa, before becoming executive vice president in charge of Chase’s international operations. After a short tenure as Chase’s vice chairman for worldwide planning, expansion and diversification, Butcher was named president and chief operating officer, reporting to David Rockefeller, then chairman and CEO.

Under Rockefeller and Butcher, Chase expanded into more than 50 countries, including Russia, Egypt and China, where American banks hadn’t previously operated. As a result of the expansion, The New York Times said at the time of Butcher's death Chase was beset by hundreds of millions of dollars in losses from poorly performing loans in developing countries such as Brazil.

Butcher was active with the American Enterprise Institute, and served for two years as member of President Ronald Reagan’s Grace Commission. He served on the boards at Celgene Corp., Firestone Tire & Rubber Co., International Paper Corp. and Texaco Inc., and was a board member of the Museum of Modern Art and the New York Zoological Society.

== Death ==
Butcher died of cancer in Hobe Sound, Florida on August 25, 2012, at the age of 85.

Business positions
Preceded by David Rockefeller	Chase CEO; 1981-1991	Succeeded by Thomas G. Labrecque
