= John Mason (businessman) =

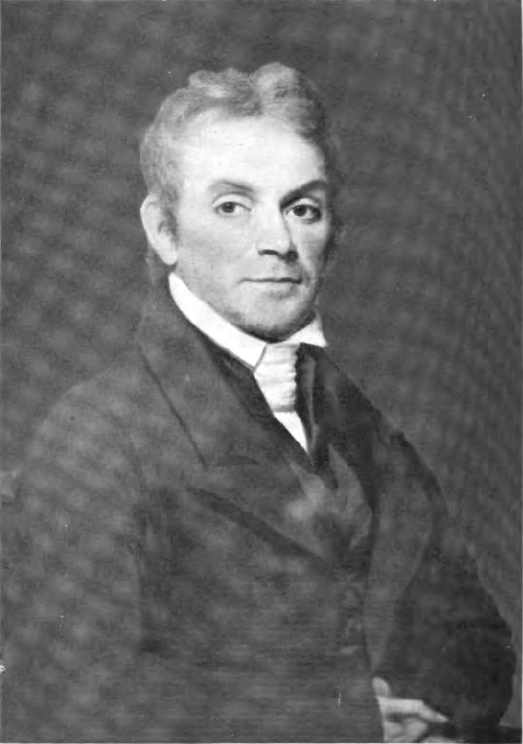
- Born: c. 1773
- Died: September 26, 1839 (aged 66)
- Occupation(s): Merchant, Banker
- Years active: 1796-1839
- Employer(s): Chemical Bank, President; New York and Harlem Railroad, President; Mason & Sharp (1796-1804); Mason & Smeades (1804-09); John Mason & Co. (1809-39)
- Known for: Second President and largest shareholder of Chemical Bank, Co-founder and second president of the New York and Harlem Railroad

John Mason (c. 1773 – September 26, 1839) was an early American businessperson, merchant, and banker. Mason served as the second president of Chemical Bank from 1831 through 1839 and would later be referred to as "the father of the Chemical Bank". Mason was a founder of the New York and Harlem Railroad, one of the first railroads in the United States in 1831 and served as the company's second president.

Mason who made much of his fortune in dry goods was among the wealthiest landowners in New York City in the early 19th century. He purchased a large portion of what is today Midtown Manhattan in 1825 including much of the land bounded by Fifth Avenue and Park Avenue between 53rd Street and 64th Street.

== Biography ==
=== Early career ===
Mason was descended from a 17th-century colonial family. He began his career as an apprentice tailor and then worked as a merchant in the dry goods business.

John Mason's name first appears in the New York Directory in the year 1796, when the firm of Mason & Sharp is mentioned as a "dry goods store, 80 William Street, cor. Maiden Lane". The following year John Mason's name appears alone as "merchant, 208 Broadway." In 1798 he moved to 84 William Street, remaining there until 1800, when he returned to 80 William Street.

In 1804, Mason founded the firm of Mason & Smedes with Abraham K. Smedes, but in 1809 the latter's name ceased to appear, and in 1810 the firm became John Mason & Co. Mason's firm remained at 178 Pearl Street for many years. By the second decade of the 19th century, Mason had established himself among the elite merchants of New York City. During the War of 1812, Mason was among a group of New York merchants that came together to help raise bonds for the U.S. government. Mason personally purchased $5,000 of bonds.

=== Chemical Bank ===
Mason became a shareholder of Chemical Bank in 1826 and would serve as its second president. Mason, who would later be referred to as "the father of the Chemical Bank", and was one of the richest merchants of his day in New York, succeeded Baltus Melick in 1831. Mason was responsible for establishing the highly conservative business culture of the young bank that would persist for nearly 90 years. For its first twenty-five years, the bank paid no dividends, nor did it pay interest on customer deposits. Mason was also responsible for leading Chemical through the Panic of 1837. When a speculative bubble collapsed on May 10, 1837, banks suspended payment of gold and silver. Although twenty years later, Chemical would stand alone and continue to make payments in specie, in this crisis the bank followed others in suspending payments. Chemical was one of the earliest to resume payments in specie.

Mason died on September 26, 1839, but his legacy of conservatism was taken on by his successors. Isaac Jones and later his cousin John Quentin Jones would lead Chemical, both serving as president, across the next forty years through 1878. Both Isaac and John Jones had close connections to John Mason, particularly Isaac who married one of John Mason's three daughters. John Q. Jones was succeeded in 1878 by George G. Williams, who had joined the bank in 1842 and served as cashier of the bank from 1855 onward. In that position, Williams was also inculcated in Chemical's conservative style of banking. Williams would serve as president from 1878 through 1903.

=== Family ===
Mason had a son and three daughters, Mary, Rebecca and Sarah. Mary Mason was married to Isaac Jones, who would later succeed Mason as president of Chemical Bank. Mason's daughter, Mary Mason Jones, who was the great-aunt of Edith Wharton, was the inspiration for the character of Mrs. Manson Mingott from The Age of Innocence. Mason left the bulk of his wealth to his daughters and largely cut his son out of his will after marrying an actress.
