= Jamie Dimon =

American banker and businessman (born 1956)

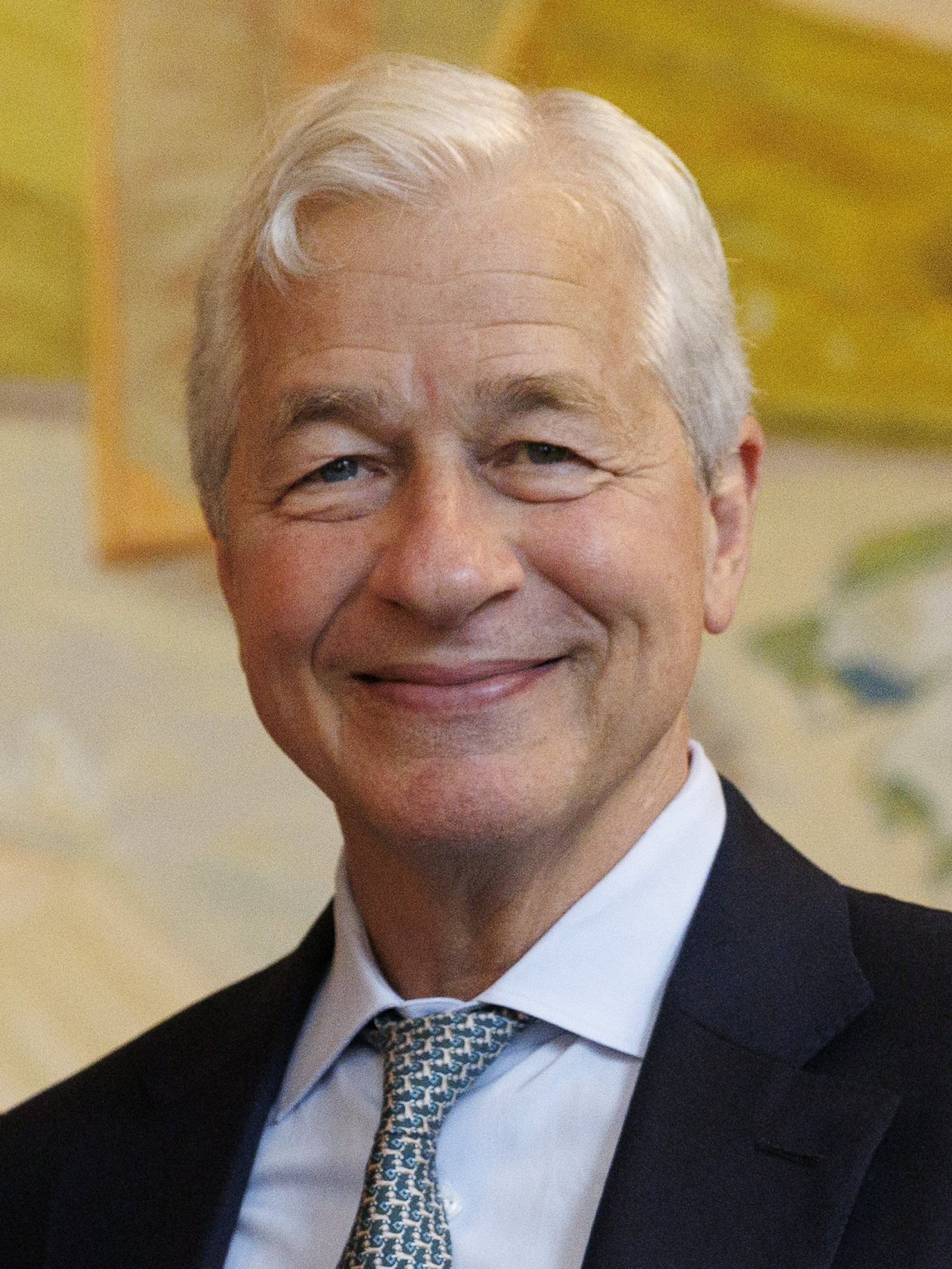
- Dimon in 2025
- Born: March 13, 1956 (age 70); New York City, U.S.
- Education: Tufts University (BA); Harvard University (MBA)
- Occupations: Businessman; Banker
- Years active: 1979–present
- Title: Chairman and CEO of JPMorgan Chase
- Spouse: Judith Kent (m. 1983)
- Children: 3

James Dimon (/ˈdaɪmən/ DY-mən; born March 13, 1956) is an American banker and manager who has been the chief executive officer (CEO) of the banking institution JPMorgan Chase since 2005 and its chairman since 2006.

Dimon began his career as a management consultant at a consulting firm in Boston. After graduating from Harvard Business School in 1982, he joined American Express, working under the mentorship of Sandy Weill. In 1986, at the age of 30, Dimon was appointed chief financial officer (CFO) of Commercial Credit and later became the firm's president. He was chief operating officer (COO) of both the insurer Travelers and the brokerage firm Smith Barney from 1990 to 1998, when he became president of Citigroup. In 2000, he was appointed CEO of Bank One, overseeing its operations until merger with JPMorgan Chase in 2004. Dimon then became COO of JPMorgan Chase, assuming the role of CEO in 2005.

He was on the board of directors of the Federal Reserve Bank of New York during the late 2010s. Dimon was included in Time magazine's 2006, 2008, 2009, and 2011 lists of the world's 100 most influential people. As of December 2025, Forbes estimates his net worth at $3 billion.

== Early life ==
Dimon was born on March 13, 1956, in New York City. He grew up in the Jackson Heights neighborhood of Queens. He is one of three sons of Theodore and Themis (née Kalos) Dimon, who were both Greek by ancestry. His paternal grandfather was a Greek immigrant who had worked as a banker in Smyrna and Athens, and later changed the family name from Papademetriou to Dimon. Dimon has an older brother, Peter, and a fraternal twin brother, Ted. Both his father and grandfather were stockbrokers at Shearson.

Dimon attended secondary school at the Browning School, a private boys' prep school on the Upper East Side of Manhattan. He then studied economics and psychology at Tufts University, graduating in 1978 with a Bachelor of Arts degree, summa cum laude. At Tufts, he wrote a paper on Shearson's mergers, which his mother sent to Sandy Weill, who then hired Dimon to work at Shearson during a summer break, doing budgets.

After working as a management consultant at the Management Analysis Center in Boston from 1978 to 1980, Dimon enrolled at Harvard Business School. He worked at Goldman Sachs during the summer between his first and second years. Dimon graduated from Harvard in 1982 with an Master of Business Administration (MBA) degree, and received Baker Scholar honors for graduating in the top 5% of his class.

== Career ==
After receiving his MBA, Dimon was convinced by Sandy Weill to turn down offers from Goldman Sachs, Morgan Stanley, and Lehman Brothers to join Weill as an assistant at American Express. Although Weill could not offer the same amount of money as the investment banks, Weill promised Dimon that he would have "fun". Dimon's father, Theodore, was an executive vice president at American Express.

=== Commercial Credit and transition into Citigroup ===
Sandy Weill left American Express in 1985, and Dimon followed him. The two then took over Commercial Credit, a consumer finance company, from Control Data. At age 30, Dimon was appointed CFO, helping turn around the company.

In 1998, through a series of mergers and acquisitions, Dimon and Weill formed a large financial services conglomerate: Citigroup. But Dimon left Citigroup in November 1998, after Weill asked him to resign during a weekend executive retreat. Rumors at the time suggested that he and Weill had argued, in 1997, over Dimon's inaction to promote Weill's daughter, Jessica M. Bibliowicz, although that happened more than a year before Dimon's departure. At least one other account cites, as the real reason, a request by Dimon to be treated as an equal.

=== Bank One (2000–2004) ===
In March 2000, Dimon became CEO of Bank One, the United States' fifth largest bank.

=== J.P. Morgan (2004–present) ===
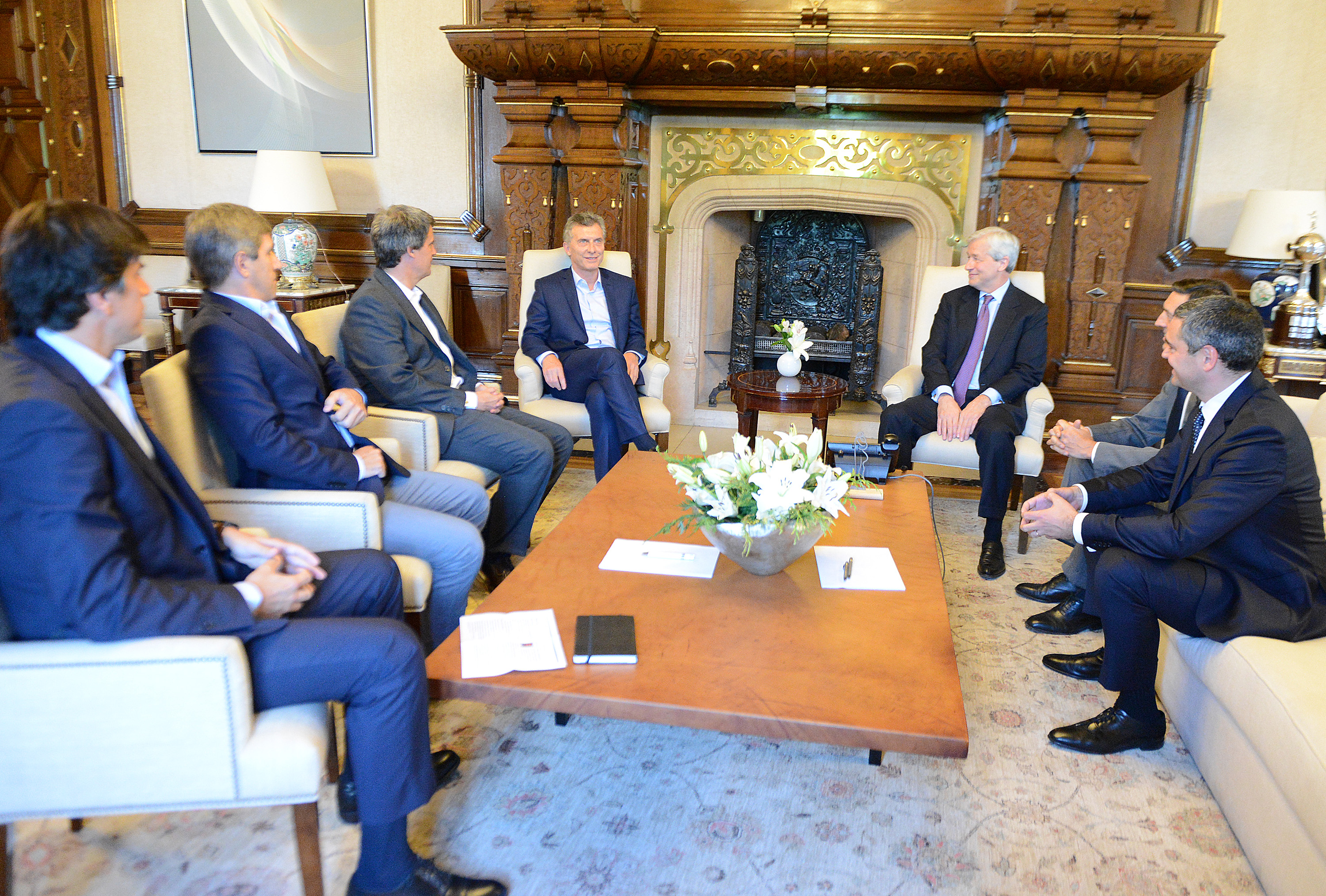
Dimon with Argentinian president Mauricio Macri, 2016

When JPMorgan Chase merged with Bank One in July 2004, Dimon became president and COO of the combined company. On December 31, 2005, he was named CEO of JPMorgan Chase, and on December 31, 2006, he was named chairman and president. In March 2008, he was a Class A board member of the Federal Reserve Bank of New York. Under Dimon's leadership, with the acquisitions during his tenure, JPMorgan Chase became the leading U.S. bank in domestic assets under management, market capitalization value and publicly traded stock value. In December 2008, Dimon called the British chancellor, Alistair Darling, to say that the 50% tax on bankers' bonuses over £25,000 (levied in the aftermath of the 2008 financial crisis) was too punitive; documents released in the Epstein files in 2026 show that the then-business secretary, Peter Mandelson, suggested that Dimon "mildly threaten" Darling over the tax. In 2009, Dimon was considered one of "The TopGun CEOs" by Brendan Wood International, an advisory agency.

On September 26, 2011, Dimon was involved in a high-profile heated exchange with Mark Carney, the governor of the Bank of Canada, in which Dimon said provisions of the Basel III international financial regulations discriminate against U.S. banks and are "anti-American". On May 10, 2012, JPMorgan Chase initiated an emergency conference call to report a loss of at least $2 billion in trades that Dimon said were "designed to hedge the bank's overall credit risks". The strategy was, in Dimon's words, "flawed, complex, poorly reviewed, poorly executed and poorly monitored". The episode was investigated by the Federal Reserve, the SEC and the FBI, and the central actor was labelled with the epithet the "London Whale."

In May 2023, Jamie Dimon testified under oath in connection with two lawsuits filed against JPMorgan Chase. The plaintiffs accused the bank of serving the late sex offender Jeffrey Epstein, who was a client between 1998 and 2013, despite internal warnings about his illegal behavior; the bank itself described the claims as meritless.

Dimon serves on the executive committee of The Business Council, an organization of global CEOs. He was chairman of the organization's executive committee during 2011 and 2012. As of 2024, Dimon is also a board member of the Business Roundtable, previously serving as chairman of the organization.

In October 2025, Dimon told the BBC that he saw an increased risk of a major U.S. market correction within the next six months to two years, described the United States as a less reliable global partner, and reaffirmed his confidence in the Federal Reserve's independence.

In January 2026, Trump filed a $5 billion lawsuit against JPMorgan Chase and Dimon claiming his accounts were closed for "political reasons".

In June 2026, Dimon hosted a roadshow to pitch investors on the IPO of SpaceX.

=== Compensation ===
Dimon is one of the few bank chief executives to have become a billionaire, largely because of his stake in JPMorgan Chase. He received a $23 million pay package for fiscal year 2011, more than any other bank CEO in the US. However, his compensation was reduced to $11.5 million in 2012 by JPMorgan Chase following a series of controversial trading losses that amounted to $6 billion. On January 24, 2014, it was announced that Dimon would receive $20 million for his work in 2013; a year of record profits and stock price under Dimon's reign, despite significant losses that year due to scandals and payments of fines. The award was a 74% raise, which included over $18 million in restricted stock.

Dimon received $34.5 million from JPMorgan Chase in fiscal year 2022, $36 million in fiscal year 2023, $39 million in fiscal year 2024, and $43 million in fiscal year 2025 (a 10.3% increase). The bank credited Dimon for his "longstanding exemplary leadership" and "continued development of top executives."

=== Management style ===
Dimon carries everywhere a sheet of paper on which he writes lists of things to do, things to check up on, and things to remember, which he systematically crosses off. He has said he uses the OODA loop method in scenario evaluation.

== Political activity ==
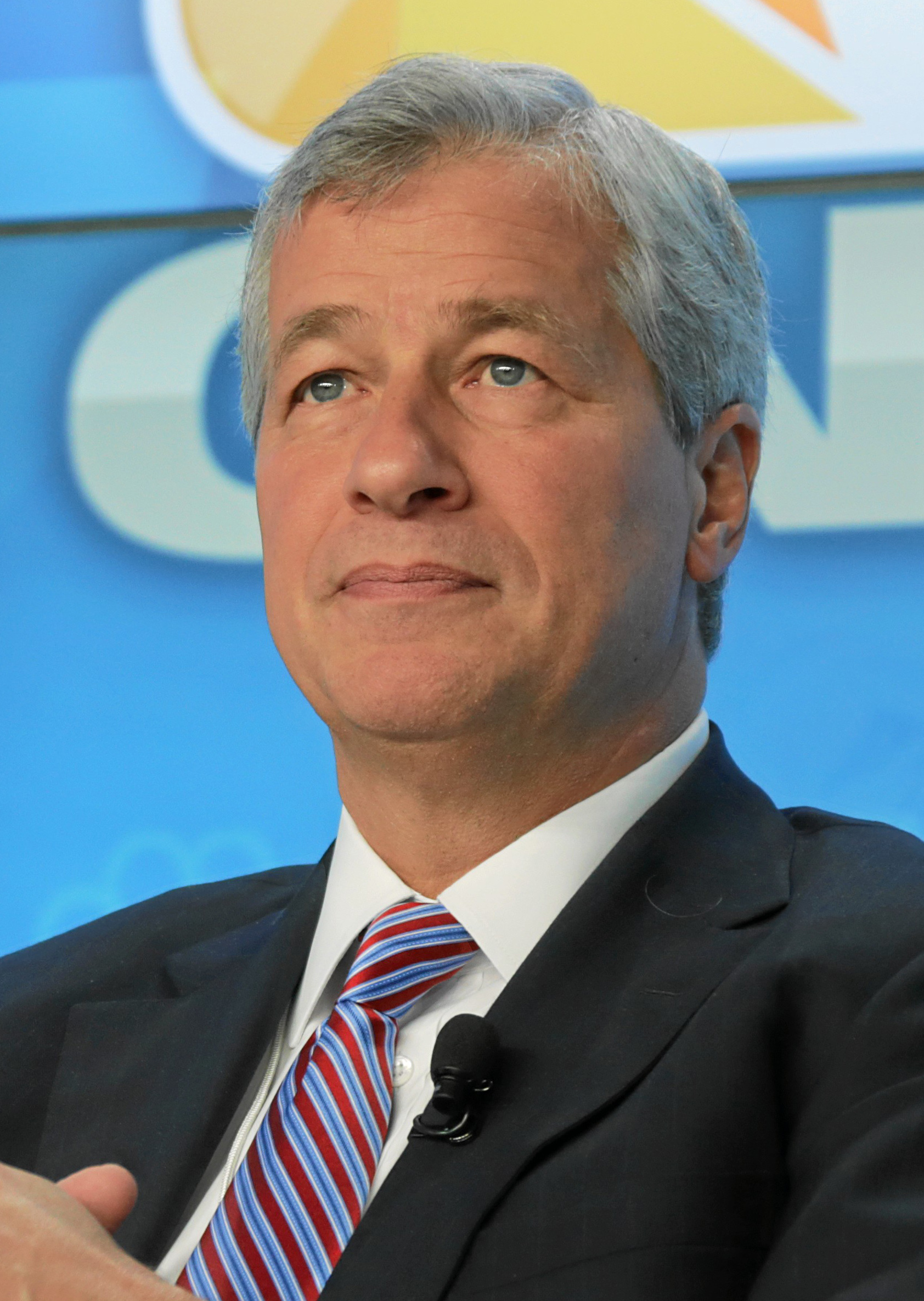
Dimon in 2013

From 1989 to 2009, Dimon donated primarily to the Democratic Party. In May 2012, he described himself as "barely a Democrat." After Barack Obama won the 2008 presidential election, there was speculation that Dimon would become Secretary of the Treasury. Obama eventually named Timothy Geithner to the position. Following the acquisition of Washington Mutual by JPMorgan Chase, Obama commented on Dimon's handling of the real-estate crash, credit crisis and the banking collapse affecting corporations nationwide, including major financial institutions like Bank of America, Citibank and Wachovia, and said he did "a pretty good job managing an enormous portfolio."

Dimon has had close ties to some people in the Obama White House, including former chief of staff Rahm Emanuel. Dimon was one of three CEOs—along with Goldman Sachs chairman Lloyd Blankfein and Citigroup CEO Vikram Pandit—said by the Associated Press to have had liberal access to former treasury secretary Timothy Geithner. Nonetheless, Dimon has often publicly disagreed with some of Obama's policies. During the 2016 United Kingdom European Union membership referendum, JPMorgan Chase, under Dimon's leadership donated large sums of money to the Remain campaign, and Dimon personally campaigned with Chancellor of the Exchequer George Osborne against Brexit.

In December 2016, Dimon joined a business forum assembled by then president-elect Donald Trump to provide strategic and policy advice on economic issues. The forum dissolved after Trump's comments on the alt-right political violence at the 2017 Unite the Right rally. During Trump's presidency, Dimon supported his Tax Cuts and Jobs Act of 2017, but condemned the Trump administration's immigration and trade policies. In a 2019 interview with 60 Minutes, Dimon claimed that the United States "is the most prosperous economy the world has ever seen" despite acknowledging issues such as income inequality and the China–United States trade war. Dimon also criticized the U.S. federal government response to the COVID-19 pandemic under Trump in a letter to shareholders which also criticized the state of education, health care and social safety nets in the United States.

During the 2020 Democratic Party presidential primaries, Dimon criticized the lack of a "strong centrist, pro-business, pro-free enterprise" candidate. In 2018 Dimon "thought about thinking about" starting his own presidential campaign, but decided that it would be too unpopular to succeed. During the 2020 United States presidential election, Dimon wrote a memorandum calling for candidates to respect the democratic process and a peaceful transition of power, writing "While strong opinions and tremendous passion characterized this U.S. election, it is the responsibility of each of us to respect the democratic process, and ultimately, the outcome." Dimon subsequently condemned the 2021 United States Capitol attack. In 2021, Trump complained that Dimon was "not a patriot" because of his company's business in China.

In May–June 2023, Dimon was encouraged by American billionaire and hedge fund manager Bill Ackman to run in the 2024 United States presidential election, after the former expressed his interest in pursuing a public office sometime in the future. Dimon clarified that he has no plans to run for office at this time, and that he is happy with his current leading position in JPMorgan Chase, where he expects to stay for three and a half more years. However, in June 2025 Dimon said his retirement is still "several years away" and that he may stick around longer.

In November 2023, Dimon said he preferred Nikki Haley over Donald Trump as the Republican nominee in the 2024 U.S. presidential election. In August 2024, Dimon published an op-ed column in The Washington Post, where he stated that the next president must "restore our faith in America." In the opinion piece, he endorsed neither Trump nor Democratic presidential nominee Kamala Harris. However, in October 2024, The New York Times reported that Dimon was privately supporting Harris' 2024 campaign.

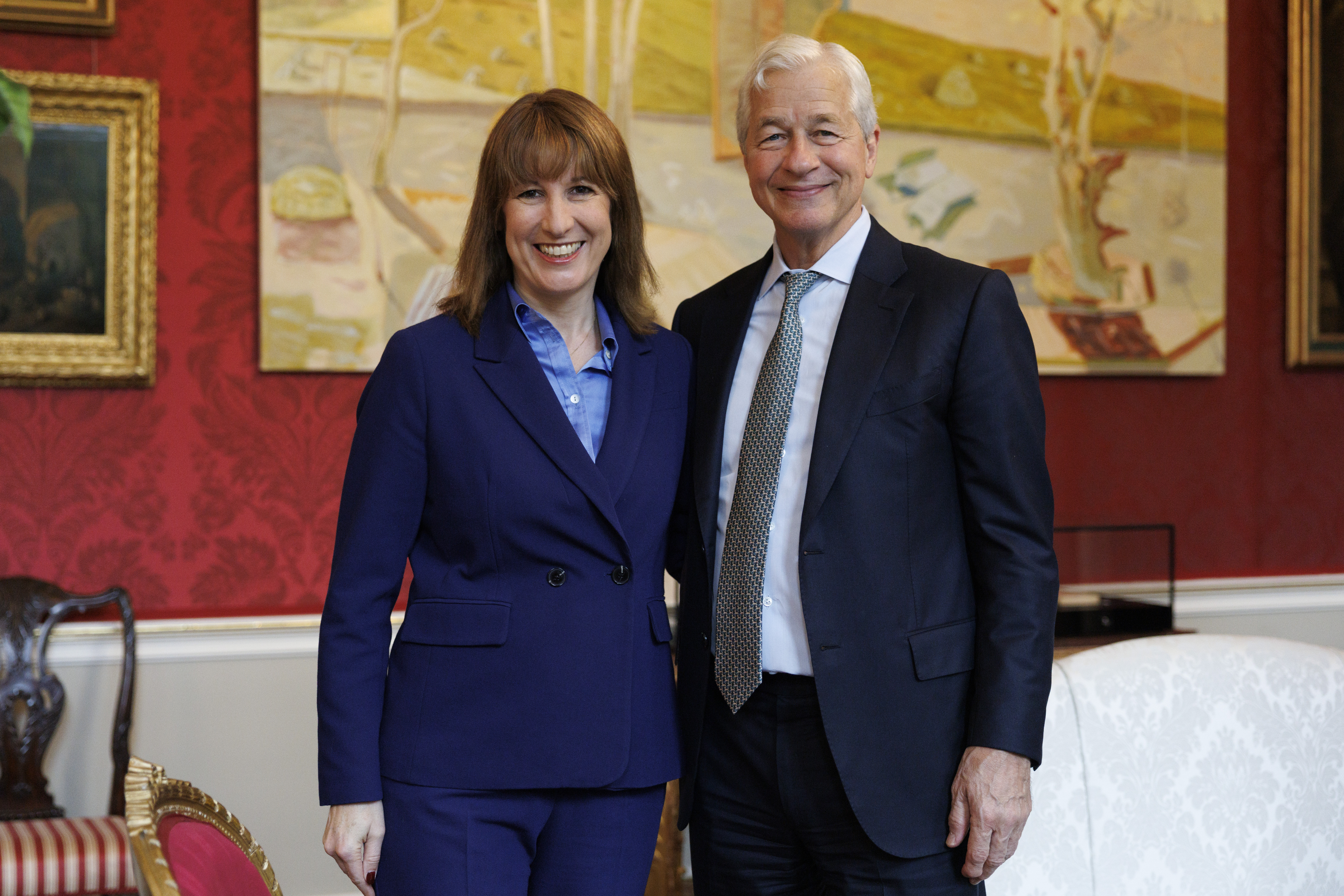
Dimon with UK Chancellor Rachel Reeves

After Donald Trump took office as president again in January 2025, Dimon said he supported Trump's tariff policies. Dimon has previously said that the tariffs were a threat to the US economy. In March 2025, amid a worsening economic outlook due to Trump's tariff threats, Dimon said that tariffs contributed to uncertainty in the markets.

In October 2025, Dimon said the ongoing US government shutdown was a "bad idea", but downplayed its implications for the economy.

== Personal life ==
In 1983, Dimon married Judith Kent, whom he met at Harvard Business School. They have three daughters: Julia, Laura, and Kara Leigh. Julia and Kara attended Duke University; Laura is a Barnard College graduate, a freelance journalist, formerly at the New York Daily News, and currently a producer for ABC News.

Dimon was diagnosed with throat cancer in 2014. He received eight weeks of radiation and chemotherapy ending in September 2014. In March 2020, at the age of 63, Dimon underwent emergency heart surgery to repair an acute aortic dissection. According to JP Morgan, Dimon recovered well from surgery, with Gordon Smith and Daniel Pinto running the bank until his return. In April 2020, Dimon returned to work in a remote capacity due to the COVID-19 pandemic.

== Awards and honors ==
- 1994: The Browning School Athletic Hall of Fame
- 2006: Golden Plate Award of the American Academy of Achievement presented by Richard M. Daley, the Mayor of Chicago
- 2010: The Executives' Club of Chicago's International Executive of the Year
- 2011: National Association of Corporate Directors Directorship 100
- 2012: Intrepid Salute Award
- 2016: Americas Society Gold Medal
- 2022: France's Legion of Honour
- 2025: National Portrait Gallery's Portrait of a Nation Award

Business positions
Preceded by William Harrison	President of JPMorgan Chase; 2004–present	Incumbent
Preceded by William Harrison	Chief Executive Officer of JPMorgan Chase; 2006–present	Incumbent
Preceded by William Harrison	Chair of JPMorgan Chase; 2007–present	Incumbent
