= Walter Penn Shipley =

American lawyer, chess player and chess organizer

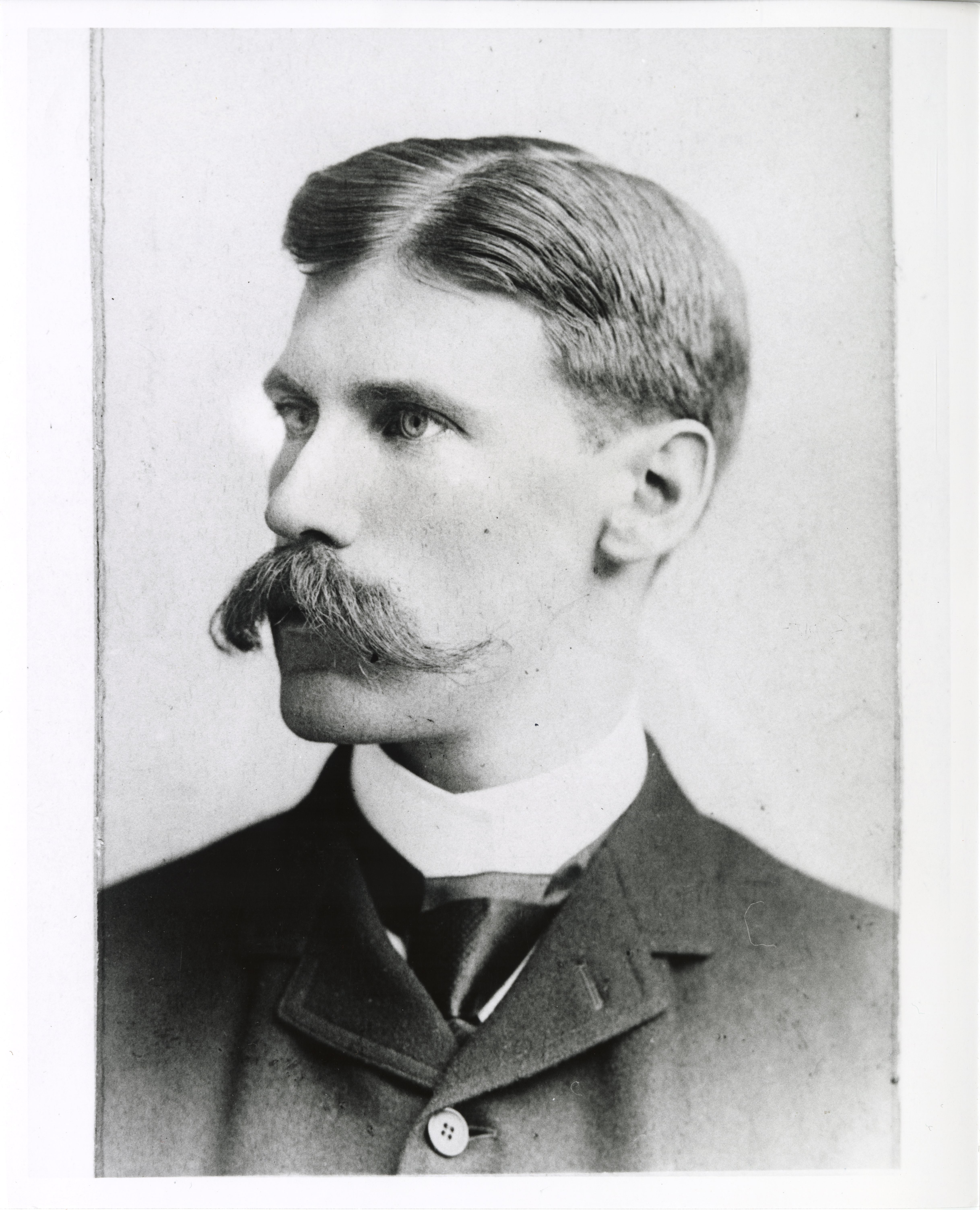
Walter Penn Shipley

Walter Penn Shipley (June 20, 1860 – February 17, 1942) was an American lawyer, chess player and chess organizer.

== Biography ==
Shipley graduated from Haverford College, and from the law school at the University of Pennsylvania. He lived and practiced law in Philadelphia.

He was a key chess organizer and promoter at the club, local, state and national levels for much of his life. Shipley was champion of many American tournaments as a player in the late 19th century. He was also a correspondence chess enthusiast. He was a mainstay at the Franklin Mercantile Chess Club in Philadelphia, the nation's second-oldest chess club, and represented the club in many matches.

Shipley became a partner in his own law firm by his late 20s, and practiced law until his retirement in 1927. He died at Philadelphia in 1942, age 81.

Shipley was a lifelong Quaker.

His professional, personal and chess papers are held by the University of Delaware library.

Shipley is the subject of a thorough 2003 biography by John Hilbert, which includes a large selection of his chess games.
