= 270 Park Avenue =

270 Park Avenue has been the address of several buildings on the west side of Park Avenue, between 47th Street and 48th Street, in the Midtown Manhattan neighborhood of New York City:

- Hotel Marguery (1917–1957)
- 270 Park Avenue (1960–2021), also known as the Union Carbide Building
- 270 Park Avenue (2025–present), also known as the JPMorgan Chase Tower
