= Douglas A. Warner III =

American banker

Douglas Warner
- Born: June 9, 1946 (age 80); Cincinnati, Ohio
- Occupation: Banker

Douglas 'Sandy' Warner (born June 9, 1946, as Douglas Alexander Warner III but widely known as "Sandy") is an American banker who joined Morgan Guaranty Trust Company of New York out of college in 1968 as an officer's assistant and rose through the ranks to become chief executive officer and chairman of the board of J.P. Morgan & Co. Inc. in 1995. Among his many accomplishments, Warner may be best known for spearheading the 2000 sale of J P Morgan & Co. to Chase Manhattan Bank for $30.9 billion.

== Biography ==
=== Early life ===
Douglas Alexander Warner III was born on June 9, 1946, in Cincinnati, Ohio, as the elder son to Douglas Alexander Warner Jr. and Eleanor (Wright) W. Warner. He has a brother, Gordon, and a sister, Marjorie. Warner came from money, growing up in the high-toned suburb of Indian Hill in a family with local social standing. For example, Warner's father served as a trustee of the Cincinnati Music Hall Association and Art Museum and chaired the United Appeal one year. Warner's grandfather (and namesake) ran his own insurance firm and was active in local golfing circles. Grandmother Warner was the daughter of a wealthy Cincinnati entrepreneur named J. Stacey Hill, who was the president of a then-prominent thousand-room Cincinnati hotel named Hotel Gibson.

In 1960 Warner's family shipped the 14-year-old Warner 500 miles away from his home in Ohio to The Hill School, a college-preparatory boarding school in Pottstown, Pennsylvania (it admitted only boys at the time); Warner's father had graduated from the same school in 1937. While a student at The Hill, Warner played junior hockey 1960–61, junior varsity (JV) hockey 1961–62, and varsity hockey 1962–64. Warner graduated from there in 1964, the same year as Academy Award-winning producer/director Oliver Stone.

=== Education and career ===
From The Hill School, Warner applied to Yale University, the same school attended by his father and uncle. In 1964, Warner entered Yale University at the age of 18 as a pre-med student. At age 18, Warner was of draft age but most likely held a 2-S (college deferment) Selective Service System classification as a student at Yale University. During his time at Yale, Warner became friends with the future President George W. Bush through then-Yale ice hockey player Roland W. Betts - now owner of the multimillion-dollar Chelsea Piers Sports & Entertainment Complex. This friendship would prove valuable as President-elect Bush later named Warner as a financial adviser to his transition team in 2000.

At the peak of the Vietnam War upheaval in the United States in May 1968, Warner graduated from Yale University with a B.A. degree and intended to go to Yale medical school after leaving Yale undergraduate. Without a college deferment, Warner most likely would have been classified as 1-A, that is to say, classified as available immediately for military service. For example, President Bush was classified as 1-A on Bush's graduation from Yale in May 1968 and was accepted into the Texas Air National Guard at the height of the ongoing Vietnam War.

With the Vietnam war and Yale medical school choices facing Warner, Warner looked to a third option based on advice from his father, an insurance man from Cincinnati, Ohio. Warner's father advised Warner to go into business to develop some "breadth" and subsequently Warner entered the management training program at Morgan Guaranty Trust Company in New York City. At that time, Morgan Guaranty Trust Company was a wholly owned subsidiary of J.P. Morgan Chase & Co. (formerly J.P. Morgan & Co. Incorporated). Over the next seven years, Warner rapidly advanced from officer's assistant (1968–1970), through assistant treasurer (1970–1972) and assistant vice president (1972–1975), to vice president in 1975.

On May 13, 1977, Warner married Patricia G. Grant with whom he had four children, Alexander, Katherine, Michael, and Alice (deceased), and now, along with Patricia's brother Thomas, are residents of Locust Valley, N.Y.

In 1983, at age 37, Warner was transferred to London, England and was named senior vice president. First, Warner was in charge of United Kingdom and Scandinavian banking operations and then became the head of oil and gas lending for the region. In becoming the general manager of the London office and Morgan's senior executive in the United Kingdom in 1986, Warner received extensive experience in U.S. and international corporate finance.

In 1987, Warner was promoted to executive vice president and returned to New York city to take charge of North American and South American corporate finance and, later that year, of the entire group worldwide.

In 1989, Warner became managing director of the Morgan Guaranty Trust Company and elected president and a director in 1990. After rising through the ranks in various positions in London and New York City, Warner succeeded Dennis Weatherstone in 1995 as Morgan's youngest CEO ever at age 49. From 1995 to 2000, Warner served as chairman and chief executive officer. In 1999, Warner was ranked 14th of the "25 Highest Paid Banking Executives in 1999" with a total compensation for the year of US$9,916,151. In 2000, Warner was mentioned as a possible candidate for President Bush's Treasury secretary along with Enron head Kenneth Lay and a few others. However, Warner was elevated to chairman of the board of J.P. Morgan Chase & Co., Chase Manhattan Bank and Morgan Guaranty Trust Company of New York, NY in 2000 and served there until his retirement on September 7, 2001. Instead, Bush named Warner as a financial adviser to his presidential transition team in 2000.

=== 2000 merger and retirement ===
Warner may be best known for spearheading the sale of J P Morgan & Co. to Chase Manhattan Bank through its then CEO William Harrison for $30.9 billion.

In retirement, Warner is a director of Anheuser-Busch Companies, Inc. and Motorola, Inc., a member of the board of counselors of The Bechtel Group, Inc., chairman of the board of managers and the board of overseers of Memorial Sloan-Kettering Cancer Center, served as the chair of the General Electric audit committee, and served on both the General Electric nominating committee and corporate governance and management development and compensation committee. In 2016 Warner was removed from his 24-year position on GE's board by CEO Jeff Immelt after the two disagreed about Immelt's succession plans. Warner appealed this move, but the board declined to bring him back. Warner is a member of the Business Council, a trustee of the Pierpont Morgan Library, and a member of the committee to Encourage Corporate Philanthropy (CECP). In between such retirement, Warner enjoys golf, skiing, and shooting as a member of Seminole Golf Club Seminole Golf Club, Links Club, River Club, Meadowbrook Club (Long Island, New York), Augusta National Golf Club, and Wequetonsing Golf Club(Harbor Springs, MI).

Warner was recently selected for a coveted six-year term on the Yale Corporation, Yale University’s governing body.

== Business legacy ==
Analysts say that Mr. Warner was a key figure throughout the 1980s and 1990s in the transformation of J.P. Morgan from a commercial bank to an investment banking firm. For example, J.P. Morgan was the first commercial bank since the 1930s to be granted the power to underwrite debt and equity securities. Under Warner, the firm ended lifelong job security as a result of a 1998 restructuring. One of his biggest cultural marks on J.P. Morgan was the creation of the "House Arrest" group, a dozen or so senior executives who met monthly to discuss management issues.

== Philanthropy ==
- A loyal Hill School Annual Fund donor, Warner funded the Douglas Warner Christian Ministries at Warner Brothers Foundation Chapel Program Fund in honor of his father, the late Douglas A. Warner Jr. '37. Warner has also served The Hill School as a term and corporate trustee. Warner gave $100,000 to have the ice hockey rink replaced.
- Warner is a member of the Business Council, a trustee of the Pierpont Morgan Library, and a member of the committee to Encourage Corporate Philanthropy (CECP).

== Awards ==
In 1998, Warner was an invited Gordon Grand Fellow lecturer at Yale University, and in 2001, he was awarded the Leadership Award from The Hill School. As an alumnus of The Hill School, Warner had proven himself "to be an exemplary leader and true role model for students in his vocation."

== See also ==
- Biography

Business positions
Preceded by Dennis Weatherstone	Chairman of J.P. Morgan & Co. 1995—2000	Succeeded by William Harrison (as Chairman of JPMorgan Chase)
