= Balthazar P. Melick =

American banker (1770–1835)

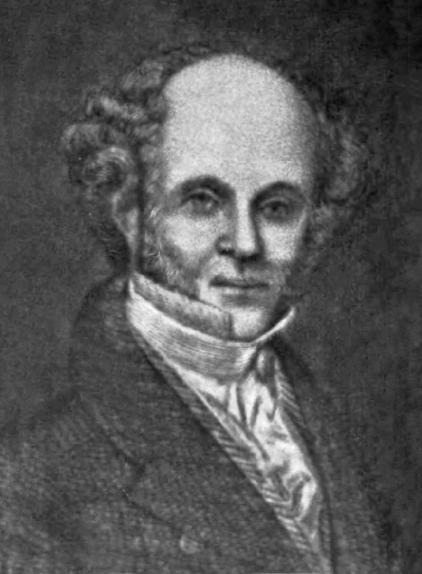
- Born: October 26, 1770; Lebanon Township, New Jersey
- Died: November 20, 1835 (aged 65)
- Other name: "Baltus"
- Occupations: Merchant, banker
- Years active: 1783–1831
- Known for: Founder of Chemical Bank, Melick & Burger

Balthazar P. Melick (also known as Baltus) (October 26, 1770 – November 20, 1835), an American merchant and banker, was the founder of Chemical Bank in 1823. Melick served as the first president of Chemical from 1823 to 1831.

== Biography ==
Melick was born in Lebanon Township, New Jersey in 1770. He started as an apprentice at a mercantile house at the age of thirteen. In 1792, at the age of twenty-one he was admitted to a partnership and for many years he was a prosperous merchant in Greenwich Village in New York City. In 1795, he was listed as a "grocer" doing business at 183 Washington Street. Melick founded the commercial house of Melick & Burger, which owned trade vessels sailing in the Caribbean, doing much of its business with the island of St. Croix. The firm, which had its offices at 76 Washington Street, owned a ship known as "Chase" which afterwards was prominent in the sugar trade.

He became a Director in the Equitable Fire Insurance Company, the Greenwich Fire Insurance and the Union Marine and Life Insurance Company.

Melick was also a noted member and secretary of the Black Friars Society, also known as the Friary, a music and social club.

=== Founder of Chemical Bank ===
Melick founded the New York Chemical Manufacturing Company, the predecessor of Chemical Bank in 1823 together with John C. Morrison, Mark Spenser, Gerardus Post, James Jenkins, William A. Seely and William Stebbins. Melick and his partners used the manufacturing company, which produced chemicals such as blue vitriol, alum, nitric acid, camphor and saltpeter, as well as medicines, paints, and dyes as a means to securing a bank charter from the New York State legislature. During the 1820s, prospective bankers found that they were more likely to be able to successfully secure a charter if the bank were part of a larger business. The following year, in April 1824, the company successfully amended its charter to allow Chemical to begin its banking practice.

Melick retired as president of the bank in 1831 in favor of John Mason, one of the richest merchants of his day in New York, and an early shareholder in the bank. Melick, who never married, died shortly thereafter in 1835.
