= J.P. Morgan & Co. =

U.S. commercial and investment banking company

- Type: Subsidiary
- Traded as: NYSE: JPM
- Industry: Investment banking Asset management Private banking
- Founded: 1871; 155 years ago
- Founders: J. P. Morgan; Anthony Drexel
- Headquarters: New York City, U.S.
- Number of employees: 296,000 (2022)
- Parent: JPMorgan Chase
- Website: www.jpmorgan.com

J.P. Morgan & Co. was an American financial institution specialized in investment banking, asset management and private banking founded by financier J. P. Morgan in 1871. Through a series of mergers and acquisitions, the company is now a subsidiary of JPMorgan Chase, the largest banking institution in the world by market capitalization. The company has been historically referred to as the "House of Morgan" or simply Morgan.

For 146 years, until 2000, J.P. Morgan specialized in commercial banking, before a merger with Chase Manhattan Bank led to the business line spinning off under the Chase brand.

== History ==
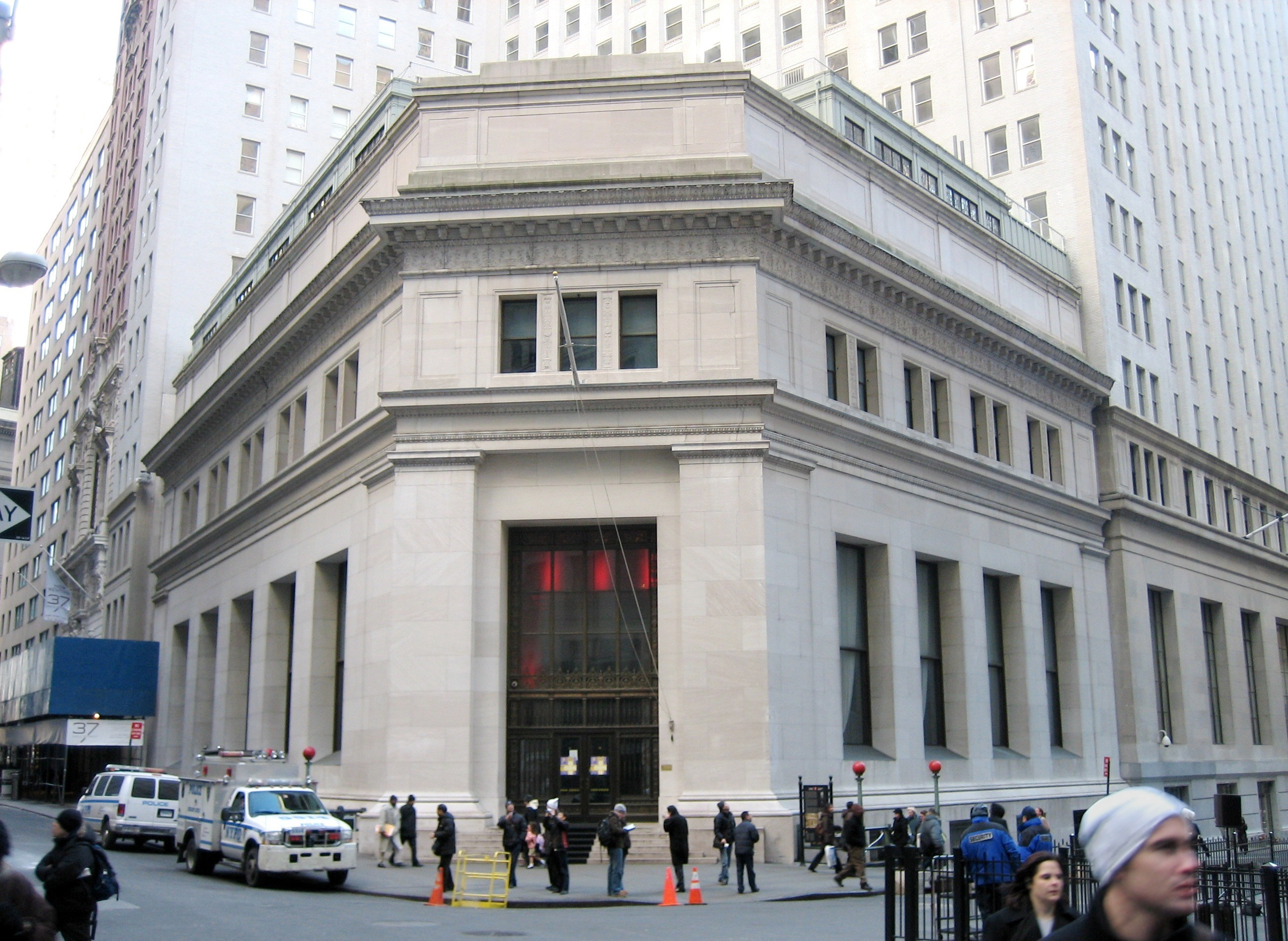
23 Wall Street, former headquarters of J.P. Morgan & Co.

The origins of the firm date back to 1854 when Junius S. Morgan joined George Peabody & Co. (which became Peabody, Morgan & Co.), a London-based banking business headed by George Peabody. Junius took control of the firm, changing its name to J.S. Morgan & Co. in 1864 on Peabody's retirement. Junius's son, J. Pierpont Morgan, first apprenticed at Duncan, Sherman, and Company in New York City, then founded his own firm with a cousin, J. Pierpont Morgan & Company, in 1864. J. Pierpont Morgan & Company traded in government bonds and foreign exchange. It also acted as an agent for Peabody's. Junius, however, considered some of Pierpont's ventures to be highly speculative. Therefore, Pierpont took on Charles H. Dabney (a connection established when Pierpont was sent to the Azores as a child) as a senior partner, and the firm was known first as Dabney, Morgan, and Company (beginning in 1864) and then "Drexel, Morgan & Co." (in 1871). In those firms, Pierpont used his Peabody connection to bring British financial capital together with the rapidly-growing U.S. industrial firms, such as railroads, which needed capital. The Drexel of Drexel, Morgan & Co. was Philadelphia banker Anthony J. Drexel, founder of what is now Drexel University.

=== House of Morgan ===
On Junius's death in 1890, Pierpont Morgan took his place at J.S. Morgan and Company. After Drexel's death, Drexel, Morgan reorganized in 1895 and became J.P. Morgan and Company. It financed the formation of the United States Steel Corporation, which took over the business of Andrew Carnegie and others and was the world's first billion-dollar corporation. In 1895, it supplied the United States government with $62 million in gold to float a bond issue and restore the treasury surplus of $100 million. In 1892, the company began to finance the New York, New Haven, and Hartford Railroad and led it through a series of acquisitions, which made it the dominant railroad transporter in New England. In 1905 a close alliance was formed with the banking house of J. P. Morgan & Co., New York, for joint action in international finance and issue operations, particularly the absorption of American securities by German investors with the Dresdner Bank.

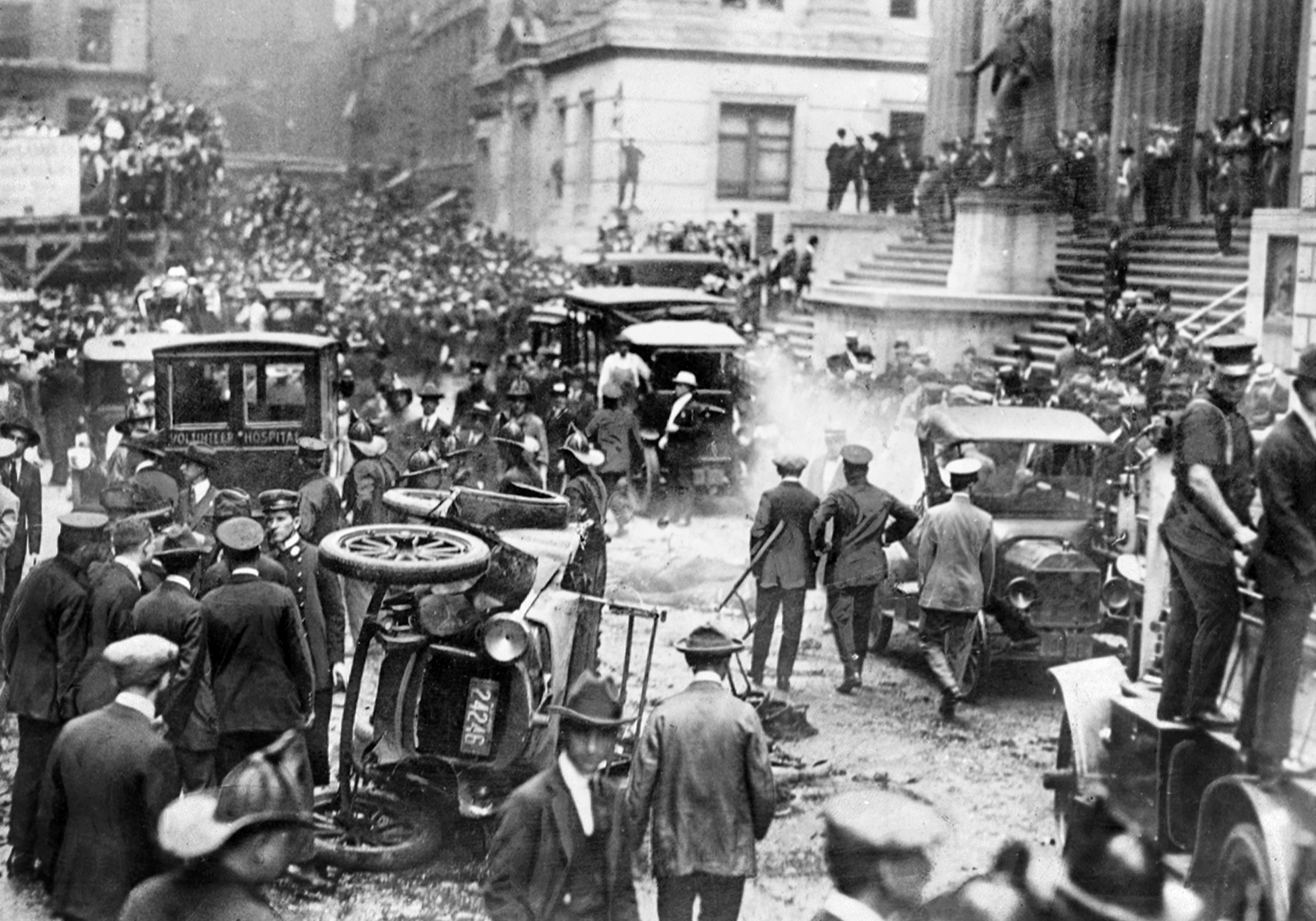
The Wall Street bombing September 16, 1920: a bomb exploded in front of the headquarters of J.P. Morgan Inc. at 23 Wall Street, killing 38 people and injuring 400.

Built in 1914, 23 Wall Street was known as "The Corner" and "The House of Morgan". At noon, on September 16, 1920, an anarchist bomb exploded in front of the bank, killing 38 and injuring 400. Shortly before the bomb went off, an unknown person placed a warning note in a mailbox at the corner of Cedar Street and Broadway. The warning read: "Remember we will not tolerate any longer. Free the political prisoners or it will be sure death for all of you. American Anarchists Fighters." While theories abound about who was behind the Wall Street bombing and why they did it, after twenty years of investigation the FBI rendered the file inactive in 1940 without ever finding the perpetrators.

=== Financing of Allied bonds during World War I ===
In August 1914, Henry P. Davison, a Morgan partner, traveled to London and made a deal with the Bank of England to make J.P. Morgan & Co. the sole underwriter of war bonds for Great Britain and France. The Bank of England became a fiscal agent of J.P. Morgan & Co. and vice versa. Over the course of the war, J.P. Morgan loaned about $1.5 billion (approximately $48.21 billion in today's dollars) to the Allies to fight against the Germans. The company also invested in the suppliers of war equipment to Britain and France, thus profiting from the financing and purchasing activities of the two European governments.

During the early 1920s, J.P. Morgan & Co. was active in promoting banks in the Southern Hemisphere, including the Bank of Central and South America.

=== Glass–Steagall Act and Morgan Stanley ===
In 1933, the provisions of the Glass–Steagall Act forced J.P. Morgan & Co. to separate its investment banking from its commercial banking operations. J.P. Morgan & Co. chose to operate as a commercial bank because after the stock market crash of 1929, investment banking was in some disrepute and commercial lending was perceived to be the more profitable and prestigious business. Also, many within J.P. Morgan believed that a change in the political climate would allow the company to resume its securities businesses but that it would be nearly impossible to reconstitute the bank if it were disassembled.

In 1935, after being barred from the securities business for over a year, the heads of J.P. Morgan made the decision to spin off its investment banking operations. Two J.P. Morgan partners, Henry S. Morgan (son of Jack Morgan and grandson of J. Pierpont Morgan) and Harold Stanley, founded Morgan Stanley on September 16, 1935, with $6.6 million of nonvoting preferred stock from J.P. Morgan partners. At the beginning, Morgan Stanley's headquarters were at 2 Wall Street, just down the street from J.P. Morgan, and Morgan Stanley bankers routinely used 23 Wall Street in closing transactions.

=== Morgan Guaranty Trust ===
Morgan Guaranty logo c. 1976

In the years following the spin-off of Morgan Stanley, the securities business proved robust, while the parent firm, which was incorporated in 1940, was less profitable. By the 1950s, J.P. Morgan was only a mid-sized bank. To bolster its position, in 1959, J.P. Morgan merged with the Guaranty Trust Company of New York to form the Morgan Guaranty Trust Company. The two banks already had numerous relationships between them and had complementary characteristics as J.P. Morgan brought a prestigious name and high-quality clients and bankers while Guaranty Trust brought a significant amount of capital. Although Guaranty Trust was nearly four times the size of J.P. Morgan at the time of the merger in 1959, J.P. Morgan was considered the buyer and nominal survivor and former J.P. Morgan employees were the primary managers of the merged company.

=== Return of J.P. Morgan & Co. ===
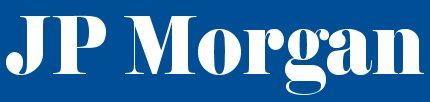
J.P. Morgan & Co. logo prior to its merger with Chase Manhattan Bank in 2000

Ten years after the merger, Morgan Guaranty established a bank holding company called J.P. Morgan & Co. Incorporated, but continued to operate as Morgan Guaranty through the 1980s before beginning to migrate back to use of the J.P. Morgan brand. In 1988, the company once again began operating exclusively as J.P. Morgan & Co.

Also in the 1980s, J.P. Morgan along with other commercial banks pushed the envelope of product offerings toward investment banking, beginning with the issuance of commercial paper. In 1989, the Federal Reserve permitted J.P. Morgan to be the first commercial bank to underwrite a corporate debt offering. In the 1990s, J.P. Morgan moved quickly to rebuild its investment banking operations and by the late 1990s would emerge as a top-five player in securities underwriting.

=== JPMorgan Chase ===
JPMorgan logo prior to its 2008 rebranding

By the late 1990s, J.P. Morgan had emerged as a large but not dominant commercial and investment banking franchise with an attractive brand name and a strong presence in debt and equity securities underwriting.

Beginning in 1998, J.P. Morgan openly discussed the possibility of a merger, and speculation arose of a pairing with Goldman Sachs, Chase Manhattan Bank, Credit Suisse or Deutsche Bank AG. In the previous decade, Chase Manhattan had emerged as one of the largest and fastest-growing commercial banks in the United States through a series of mergers. In 2000, it merged with J.P. Morgan to form JPMorgan Chase & Co.

The combined JPMorgan Chase offered investment banking, commercial banking, retail banking, asset management, private banking and private equity businesses.

In 2004, JPMorgan began a joint venture with Cazenove, which combined Cazenove's investment banking operations with JPMorgan's UK investment banking business. By 2010 JPMorgan bought the company out. J.P. Morgan Cazenove is a marketing name for the U.K. investment banking businesses and EMEA cash equities and equity research businesses of JPMorgan Chase & Co. and its subsidiaries.

In 2005, JPMorgan Chase acknowledged that its two predecessor banks had received ownership of thousands of slaves as collateral prior to the Civil War. The company apologized for contributing to the "brutal and unjust institution" of slavery. The bank paid $5 million in reparations in the form of a scholarship program for Black students.

J.P. Morgan, the company itself, is still active as the business and investment banking subsidiary of JPMorgan Chase; Chase Manhattan Bank is still active as the personal banking subsidiary of the company.

== List of Chairman and CEOs of J.P. Morgan & Co. ==
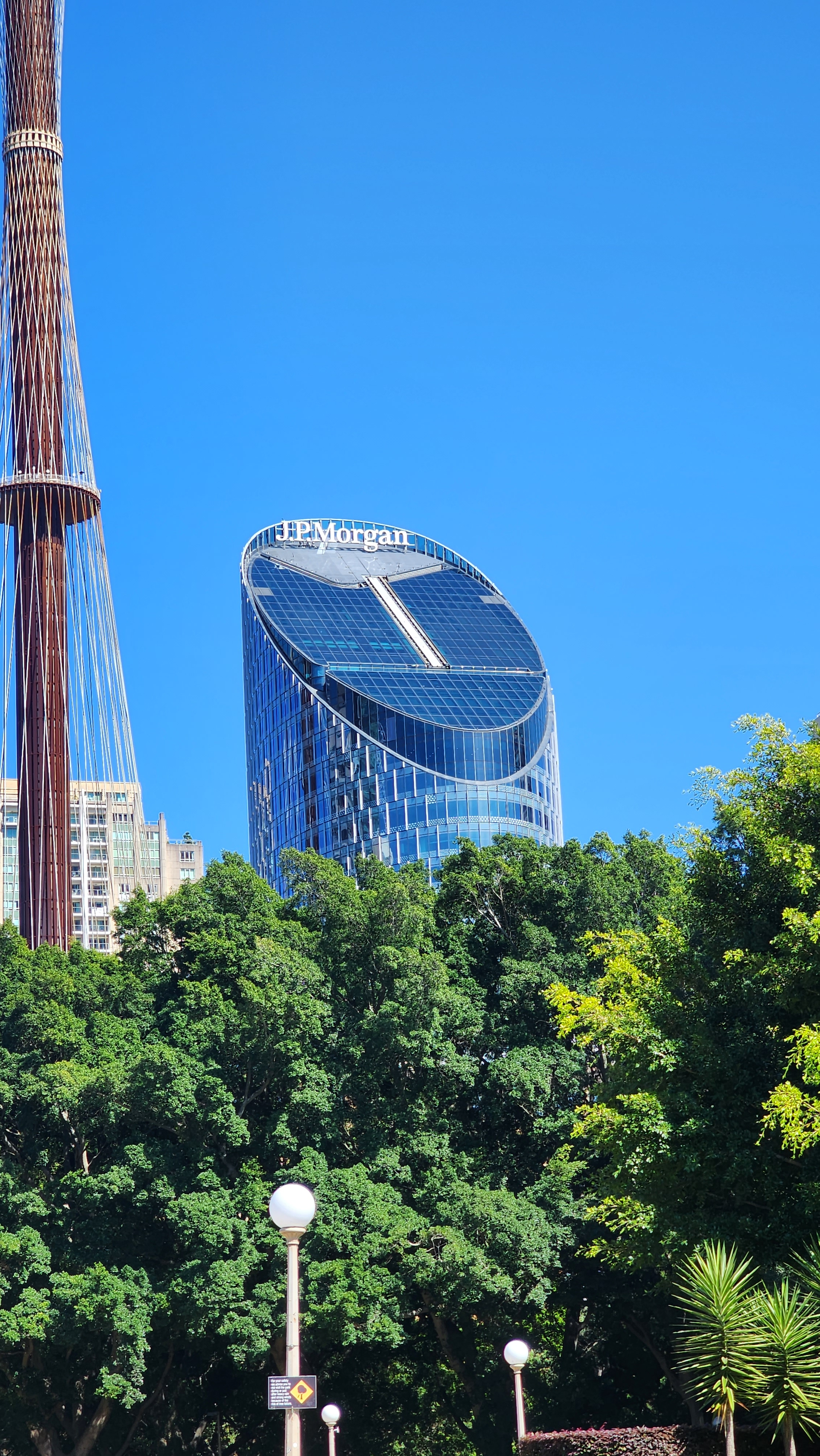
J.P.Morgan office in Sydney

Following J.P. Morgan & Co.'s formation in 1871, John Pierpont "J. P." Morgan was universally accepted as its highest executive authority (despite holding the mere title of "senior partner"). Upon Morgan's death in 1913, the bank's leadership passed to his son, John Pierpont "Jack" Morgan Jr. Once J.P. Morgan & Co. was incorporated in 1942, Jack emerged as its first chief executive within his capacity as chairman of the board of directors. Henceforth, the bank would be led by 12 executives (eight of whom chaired the board of directors while simultaneously holding the title of CEO) before merging with Chase Manhattan Bank to become JPMorgan Chase.

== Chairman of the Board of Directors ==
- J.P. Morgan Jr. (1942–1943)
- Thomas W. Lamont (1943–1948)
- Russell C. Leffingwell (1948–1950)
- George Whitney (1950–1955)

=== Chairman and CEOs ===
- Henry C. Alexander (1955–1965)
- Thomas S. Gates Jr. (1965–1969)
- John Meyer Jr. (1969–1971)
- Ellmore C. Patterson (1971–1978)
- Walter Hines Page II (1978-1979)
- Lewis Thompson Preston (1979–1990)
- Dennis Weatherstone (1990–1995)
- Douglas A. Warner III (1995–2000)
- Jamie Dimon (2005-present)

== J.P. Morgan Reserve Card ==
Latest design update of the J.P. Morgan Reserve Card

The J.P. Morgan Reserve Card, formerly branded and colloquially known as the Palladium Card, is a credit card issued by J.P. Morgan (Note: J.P. Morgan & Co. is a subsidiary of JPMorgan Chase specialized in commercial banking, investment banking, and private banking.) on the Visa network. It is reserved for the wealthiest clients of the firm's global private bank. The card is minted out of a brass alloy, laser-engraved, and plated with metal palladium and 23-karat gold. Eligibility for the card is not fully known as it is invitation-only and at the discretion of J.P. Morgan. The card does not report to credit bureaus or maintain a pre-set credit limit. It is considered a status symbol among the affluent.

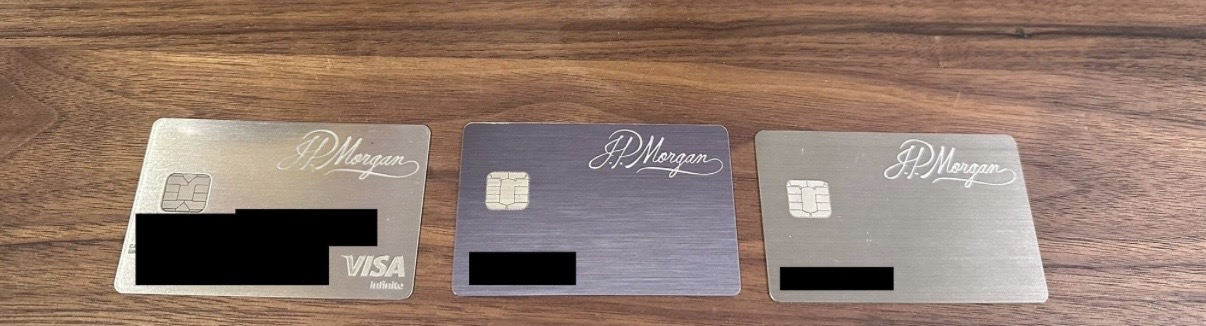
Evolution of the J.P. Morgan Reserve Card

The card was launched in September 2009, following the 2008 financial crisis, for J.P. Morgan's high-net-worth individual clients. Its original name, the Palladium Card, reflected the card's composition: minted out of a brass alloy, laser-engraved, and plated with metal palladium. The card was re-branded as the J.P. Morgan Reserve Card in September 2016.Bloomberg described the Palladium Card as the "card for the 1% of the 1%". Clients of J.P. Morgan who are invited to carry the card must have a reported minimum of US$10 million in assets under management (AUM) with the private bank. The firm declined to confirm this figure as part of their eligibility requirements.

== See also ==
- James Hood Wright
- History of banking in the United States
- J.P. Morgan Reserve Card (Palladium Card)

== Sources ==
- Carosso, Vincent P. The Morgans: Private International Bankers, 1854–1913. Cambridge, MA: Harvard University Press, 1987.
- Carosso, Vincent P. Investment Banking in America: A History. Cambridge, MA: Harvard University Press, 1970.
- Chernow, Ron. The House of Morgan: An American Banking Dynasty and the Rise of Modern Finance, (2001) ISBN 0-8021-3829-2
- Fraser, Steve. Every Man a Speculator: A History of Wall Street in American Life. New York:HarperCollins, 2005.
- Geisst, Charles R. (2004). Wall Street: A History from Its Beginnings to the Fall of Enron. Oxford University Press. Archived from the original on July 1, 2007 – via Questia.
- Moody, John. The Masters of Capital: A Chronicle of Wall Street. New Haven, CT: Yale University Press, 1921.
- Morris, Charles R. The Tycoons: How Andrew Carnegie, John D. Rockefeller, Jay Gould, and J. P. Morgan Invented the American Supereconomy (2005) ISBN 978-0-8050-8134-3
- Pak, Susie J. Gentlemen Bankers: The World of J.P. Morgan. (Harvard University Press, 2013) excerpt, 1890s-1930s
- Strouse, Jean. Morgan: American Financier. Random House, 1999. 796 pp. ISBN 978-0-679-46275-0
