= Bannard =

Bannard is a surname. Notable people with the surname include:

- John Bannard (fl. 1412), British friar
- Otto T. Bannard (1854–1929), American attorney, businessman, and philanthropist
- Walter Darby Bannard (1934–2016), American abstract painter
- W. H. Bannard (1875–1913), American football player and coach

== See also ==
- Barnard
