= Mortimer N. Buckner =

American banker

Mortimer Norton Buckner

President of the New York Clearing House
- In office October 1931 – October 1933
- Preceded by: Jackson E. Reynolds
- Succeeded by: George W. Davison

President of the New York Trust Company
- In office January 1916 – 1921
- Preceded by: Otto T. Bannard
- Succeeded by: Harvey Dow Gibson

Personal details
- Born: Mortimer Norton Buckner; March 10, 1873 New Orleans, Louisiana, U.S.
- Died: February 25, 1942 (aged 68) Manhattan, New York, U.S.
- Resting place: Cave Hill Cemetery, Louisville, Kentucky, U.S.
- Spouse: Paula Kellerman (m. 1908)
- Children: 2
- Education: St. Paul School
- Alma mater: Yale University

Mortimer Norton Buckner (March 10, 1873 – February 25, 1942) was an American banker who served as president and chairman of the board of New York Trust Company, the New York Clearing House, and the National Credit Corporation.

== Early life ==
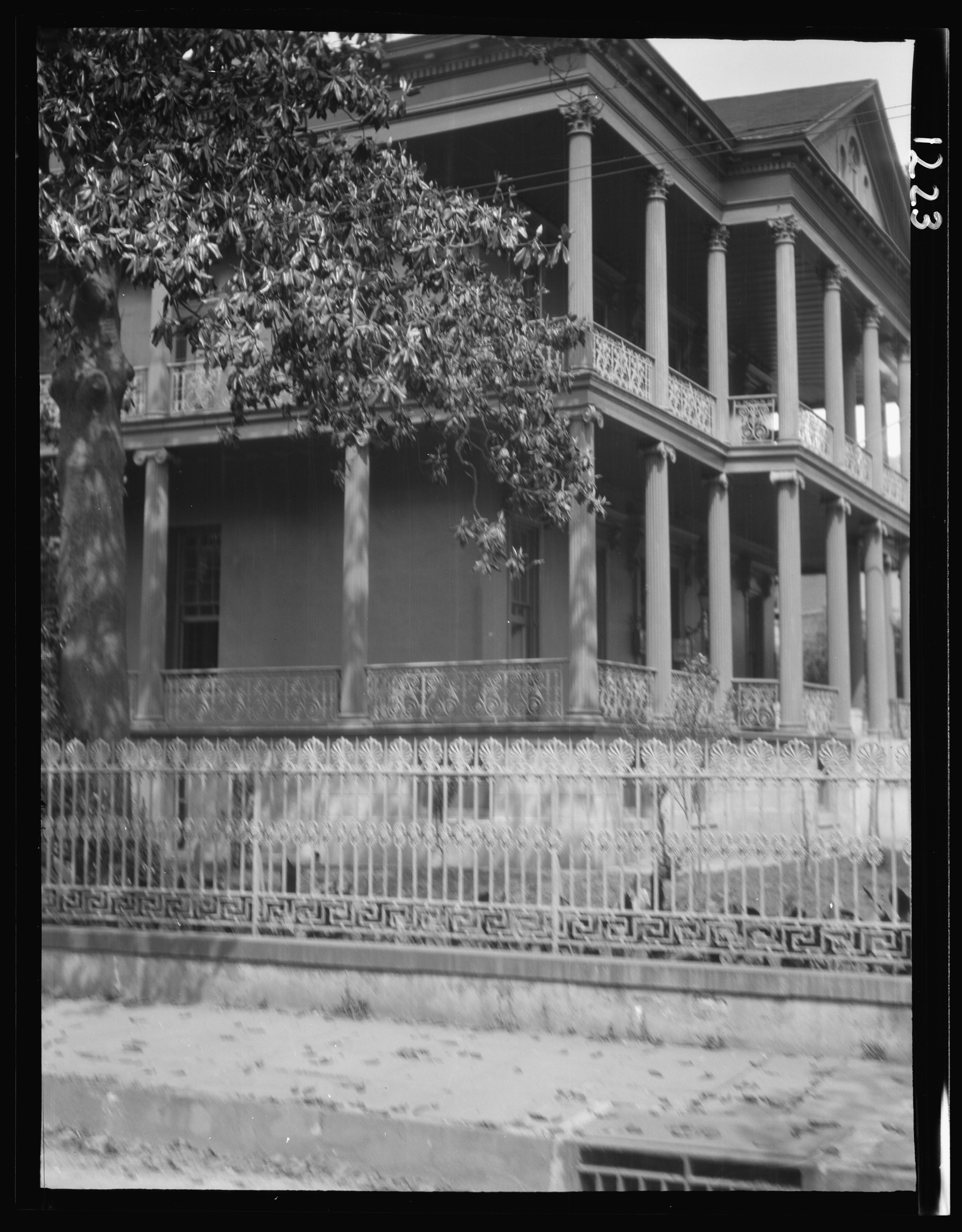
The Buckner Mansion in New Orleans

Buckner was born on March 10, 1873, in New Orleans, Louisiana, and named after his maternal grandfather, who had died six months earlier. He was the only son of Newton Buckner (1841–1899) and Permelia Grant (née Norton) Buckner (1846–1933). Among his sisters were Katherine (née Buckner) Avery, Clara Norton Buckner (who died young), Minnie Norton (née Buckner) Barkley, Edith Fearn (née Buckner) Howard, and Frances Hewitt (née Buckner) Kemper.

His paternal grandparents were Henry Sullivan Buckner, a cotton broker who built a mansion at 1410 Jackson Avenue in New Orleans in 1856, and Catharine (née Allan) Buckner. His aunt, Ellen Buckner, was the wife of U.S. Senator from Louisiana and Ambassador to France James B. Eustis. His maternal grandparents were Mortimer Oliver Hubbard Norton, a prominent New Orleans merchant, and Anna Richardson (née Grant) Norton, a first cousin of President Ulysses S. Grant (through his father, Jesse Root Grant, Anna's half-uncle).

After attending the Cathedral School of St. Paul in Garden City, Buckner graduated from Yale University with the class of 1895. He later served as president of the Yale Club of New York until 1922 when he was succeeded by George Townsend Adee. In 1928, he was elected a Fellow of the Yale Corporation, the same year he received an honorary M.A. degree from Yale. He retired from the Yale Corporation in 1940. In 1932, he received an honorary Doctor of Laws from Colgate University.

== Career ==
After graduating from Yale, Buckner worked as a traveling salesman and insurance salesman before coming to New York City in 1901 to join the Continental Trust Company as a clerk working out of the Blair & Co. Building on Broad Street. In 1903, he was made vice president of the company and the following year, Continental Trust merged with the New York Security and Trust Company. New York Security and Trust's president, Charles S. Fairchild, became chairman of the board of trustees, and Continental's president, Otto T. Bannard, became president of the new entity, which was renamed the New York Trust Company the following year in 1905. In January 1916, Buckner succeeded Bannard as president of the New York Trust Company and Bannard became Chairman of the Board and of the Executive Committee.

In 1921, New York Trust merged with Liberty National Bank of New York. Harvey Dow Gibson, the former president of Liberty, became president while Buckner succeeded Bannard as chairman of the board. The merged company had capital of $10,000,000 and "undivided profits and surplus of nearly $20,000,000" and occupied offices that had been prepared for Liberty in the American Surety Company Building at 100 Broadway.

In 1919, he was named a director of Interborough Rapid Transit Company, replacing Daniel G. Reid.

=== New York Clearing House ===
In October 1931, Buckner was elected to succeed Jackson E. Reynolds (president of the First National Bank) as president of the New York Clearing House. He was reelected in 1932, and served in the role until October 1933 when Buckner retired (in accordance with custom), and was succeeded by George W. Davison (chairman of Central Hanover Bank and Trust Company).

In 1933, the failure of the Harriman National Bank and Trust Company resulted in a government suit in equity seeking $9,375,000 against the twenty member banks of the Clearing House to compel them to keep assurances of the Clearing House to protect depositors of the Harriman bank under certain conditions. During the trial before the New York Supreme Court in 1936, Brucker (whose bank was one of eleven which paid up their share before trial), testified that "the refusal of two of the banks caused all of the banks to repudiate the assurances given to the Federal Controller of Currency."

=== Depression relief efforts ===
During the Great Depression, Brucker "was the originator, organizer and driving force behind virtually every cooperative effort by the Wall Street bankers to meet the tide of deflation." In 1931, he helped organize and served as president of the National Credit Corporation, a "$500,000,000 bankers' pool which was a forerunner of the RFC, he helped to save hundreds of small banks throughout the county."

In 1932, he was an organizer and president of the Commodities Finance Corporation, and in the same year he was "one of twelve bankers and industrialists serving on a committee formed by the Federal Reserve Bank of New York to aid the Federal Reserve System in a credit-expansion program." Also in 1932, Brucker was being selected by the ten banks with deposits of more than $150,000,000 as their only nominee for membership on the new State Banking Board, Group 1, which acted as an advisory "cabinet" to the New York State Superintendent of Banks. After his death in 1942, Governor Herbert H. Lehman nominated F. Abott Goodhue (president of the Bank of Manhattan Company) to take his place.

The following year, Buckner was a leader in efforts to organize cooperation of Wall Street banks and trust companies to help title and mortgage companies meet maturities of $700,000,000. He was president of the Realty Stabilization Corporation and in November 1933 when sixty-four committees of bankers and business men were appointed by the Reconstruction Corporation to speed liquidation of more than $3,000,000,000 of assets of closed national and state banks, he was named district chairman for the Second Federal Reserve District, comprising New York and parts of New Jersey and Connecticut.

=== Later career ===
Buckner served as a director of the 1939 New York World's Fair held at Flushing Meadows–Corona Park in Queens. He was also a member of the World's Fair finance committee and chairman of the World's Fair executive committee.

At the time of his death, he was serving as a trustee of the estate of James A. Stillman and as chairman of the board of the New York Trust Company as well as a member of the trust committee. The company ended the post of chairman after his death. He was also connected with the Sage Land and Investment Company. His seat on the board of National Distillers Products Corporation was filled by then president of New York Trust, John E. Bierwith.

== Personal life ==
On April 25, 1908, Buckner was married to Paula Kellerman in Kingston, New York. In Manhattan, the Buckners lived at 430 Park Avenue (and later at 142 East 71st Street). They were the parents of:

- Caroline Buckner (1909–1972), who married Harvard graduate Owen Lloyd Winston, a son of Owen Winston of Gladstone, New Jersey, a director of Brooks Brothers.
- Newton Buckner (1913–2005), a graduate of St. Paul's School and Yale who served as a Lt. Commander in the U.S. Naval Reserve during World War II and as the Assistant Secretary to Gov. Thomas E. Dewey. In 1937, he married Joan Sterling, a daughter of John C. Sterling of Greenwich, Connecticut. Around 1969, he married Dorothy Blake.

Between 1927 and 1929, Buckner hired the Olmsted Brothers to design the landscape architecture at his summer residence in Fishers Island, New York.

Buckner died at Doctors Hospital in Manhattan on February 25, 1942, after suffering a heart attack the day before at his office. After a service attended by former President Herbert Hoover at St. Bartholomew's Church in Manhattan, he was buried at Cave Hill Cemetery in Louisville, Kentucky. At the time of his death, it was estimated that the entire value of his estate was $120,000, all of which was personal property. Buckner left a gross estate of $387,086, while his debts, administration and funeral expense total $1,320,240, primarily state and federal taxes. His widow died in Saratoga, California, in 1971.

=== Legacy ===
Shortly after his death, the New York Trust Company commissioned a portrait of Buckner from Raymond P. R. Neilson, N.A. for the New York Clearing House to hang alongside the twenty-seven past presidents of the House.
