= Presidency of Herbert Hoover =

U.S. presidential administration from 1929 to 1933

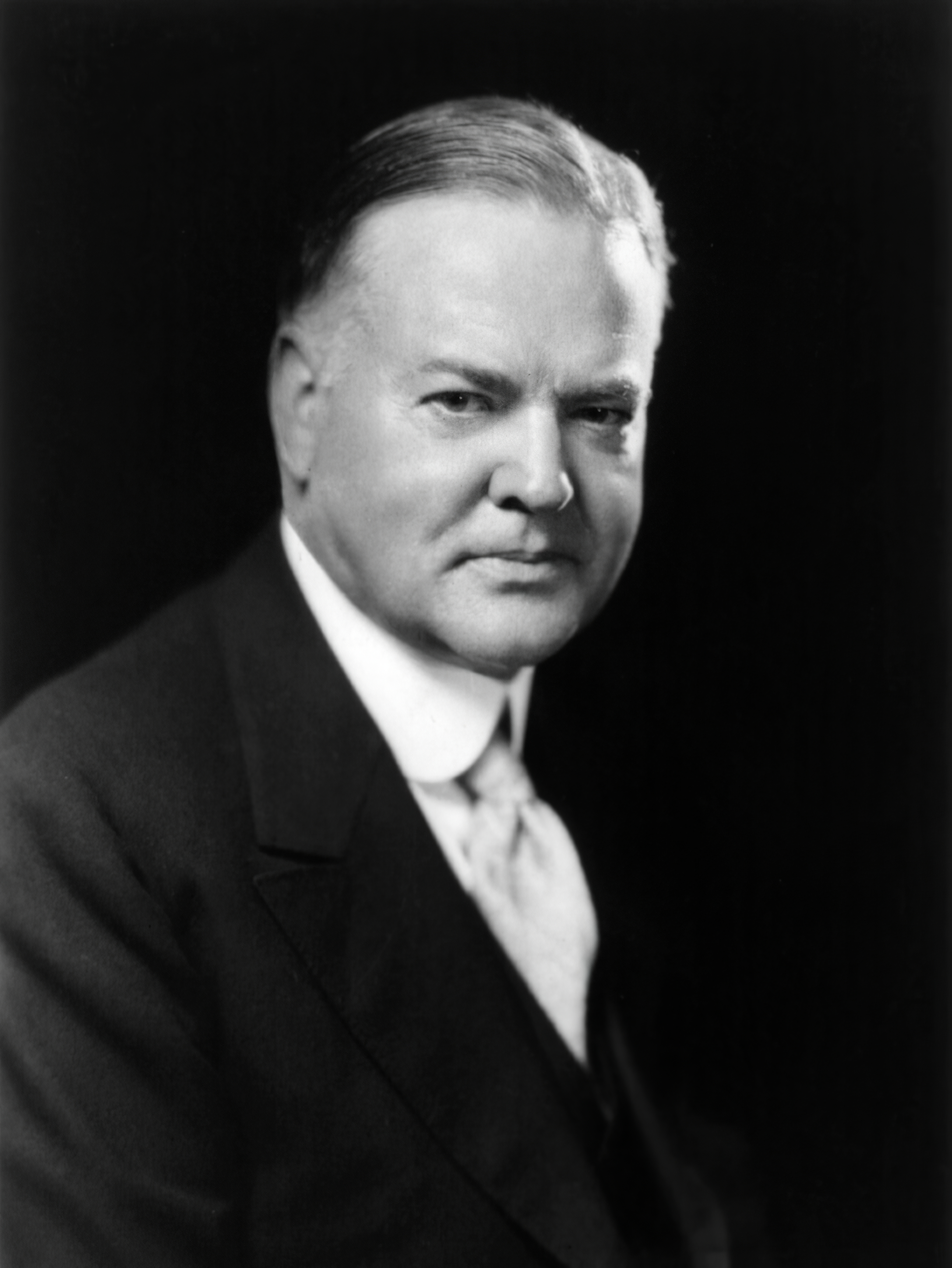
- Hoover in 1928
- Presidency of Herbert Hoover; March 4, 1929 – March 4, 1933
- Vice President: Charles Curtis
- Cabinet: See list
- Party: Republican
- Election: 1928
- Seat: White House
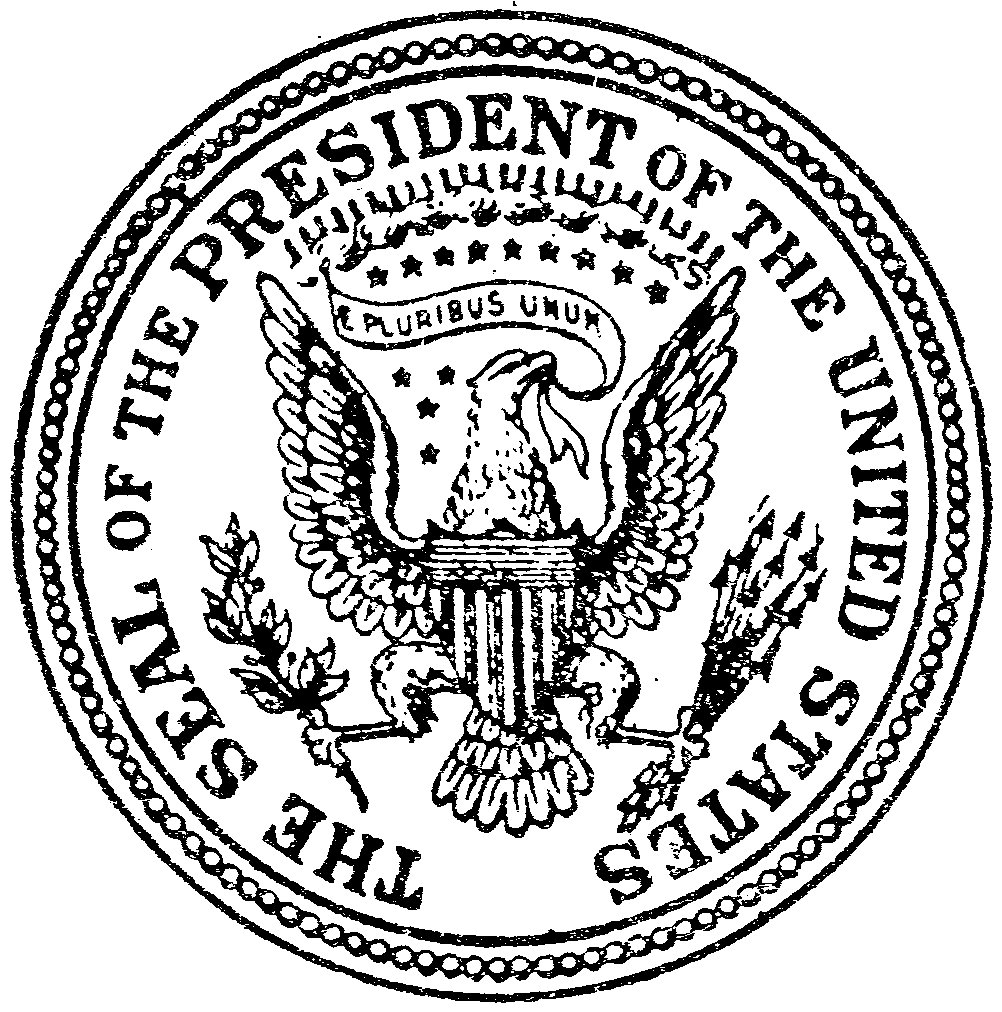
- Seal of the president (1894–1945)

Herbert Hoover's tenure as the 31st president of the United States began on his inauguration on March 4, 1929, and ended on March 4, 1933. Hoover, a Republican, took office after a landslide victory in the 1928 presidential election over Democrat Al Smith of New York. His presidency ended following his landslide defeat in the 1932 presidential election by Democrat Franklin D. Roosevelt, after one term in office.

Hoover was the third consecutive Republican president, and he retained many of the previous administration's policies and personnel, including Secretary of the Treasury Andrew Mellon. Hoover favored policies in which government, business, and labor worked together to achieve economic prosperity, but he generally opposed a direct role for the federal government in the economy. Seeking to address an ongoing farm crisis, Hoover signed the Agricultural Marketing Act of 1929. Despite growing public resistance to Prohibition, Hoover increased federal enforcement of Prohibition. In foreign affairs, Hoover favored non-interventionism in Latin America and pursued disarmament policies with the London Naval Treaty.

When the Wall Street Crash of 1929 struck less than eight months after he took office, Hoover tried to combat the ensuing Great Depression by reassuring public confidence and working with business leaders and local government. He also approved the Smoot–Hawley Tariff of 1930, which raised tariff rates and reduced international trade. As the depression worsened in 1931 and 1932, Hoover reluctantly gave in to calls for direct federal intervention, establishing the Reconstruction Finance Corporation and signing a major public works bill. At the same time, he signed the Revenue Act of 1932, which sought to maintain a balanced budget by raising taxes. However, the economy did not recover, and as a result, Hoover suffered an overwhelming defeat in the 1932 election. Hoover is usually ranked in the bottom third among U.S. presidents.

Herbert Hoover remains the only president to have outlived every member of his cabinet.

== Election of 1928 ==
After President Calvin Coolidge announced in August 1927 that he would not seek a second full term of office in the 1928 presidential election, Hoover emerged as the front-runner for the Republican presidential nomination. While Hoover gained the support of important party constituencies and won several primaries, some party leaders were at best, lukewarm to his candidacy. Coolidge viewed Hoover's candidacy with ill-concealed disgust, remarking that "for six years that man has given me unsolicited advice—all of it bad." Hoover's opponents were unable to unite around an alternative candidate, and Hoover won the presidential nomination on the first ballot of the 1928 Republican National Convention. The delegates considered re-nominating Vice President Charles Dawes to be Hoover's running mate, but Coolidge, who hated Dawes, remarked that this would be "a personal affront" to him. The convention instead selected Senator Charles Curtis of Kansas, who had Native American ancestry.

1928 electoral vote results

Delegates to the 1928 Democratic National Convention nominated New York Governor Alfred E. Smith, who was described by Smith ally Franklin D. Roosevelt as "the Happy Warrior of the political battlefield." Hoover campaigned for efficiency and the Republican record of prosperity. Smith ran on his record of efficiency earned over four terms as governor. Both candidates were pro-business, and each promised to improve conditions for farmers, reform immigration laws, and maintain America's isolationist foreign policy. They differed on the Volstead Act, which outlawed the sale of liquor and beer. Smith was a "wet" who called for its repeal, whereas Hoover gave limited support for Prohibition, calling it an "experiment noble in purpose." While Smith won extra support among Catholics in the big cities, he was the target of intense anti-Catholic rhetoric from the Ku Klux Klan, as well as numerous Protestant preachers in rural areas across the South and West.

In the November election, Republicans won an overwhelming victory. Though Smith carried every large urban area in the country, Hoover received 58 percent of the popular vote and a massive 444 to 87 Electoral College majority. Hoover won 40 states, including Smith's home state; he also succeeded in cracking the "Solid South", winning in five traditionally Democratic states. Historians agree that Hoover's national reputation and the booming economy, combined with deep splits in the Democratic Party over religion and prohibition, were the decisive factors in the 1928 election.

== Elections during the Hoover presidency ==
Congressional party leaders
		Senate leaders		House leaders	
Congress	Year	Majority	Minority	Speaker	Minority
71st	1929.03.04.–1931.03.04.	Watson	Robinson	Longworth	Tilson
72nd	1931.03.04.-1933.03.04.	Watson	Robinson	Garner	Rainey

Republican seats in Congress
Congress	Senate	House
71st	56	270
72nd	48	218

== Transition ==
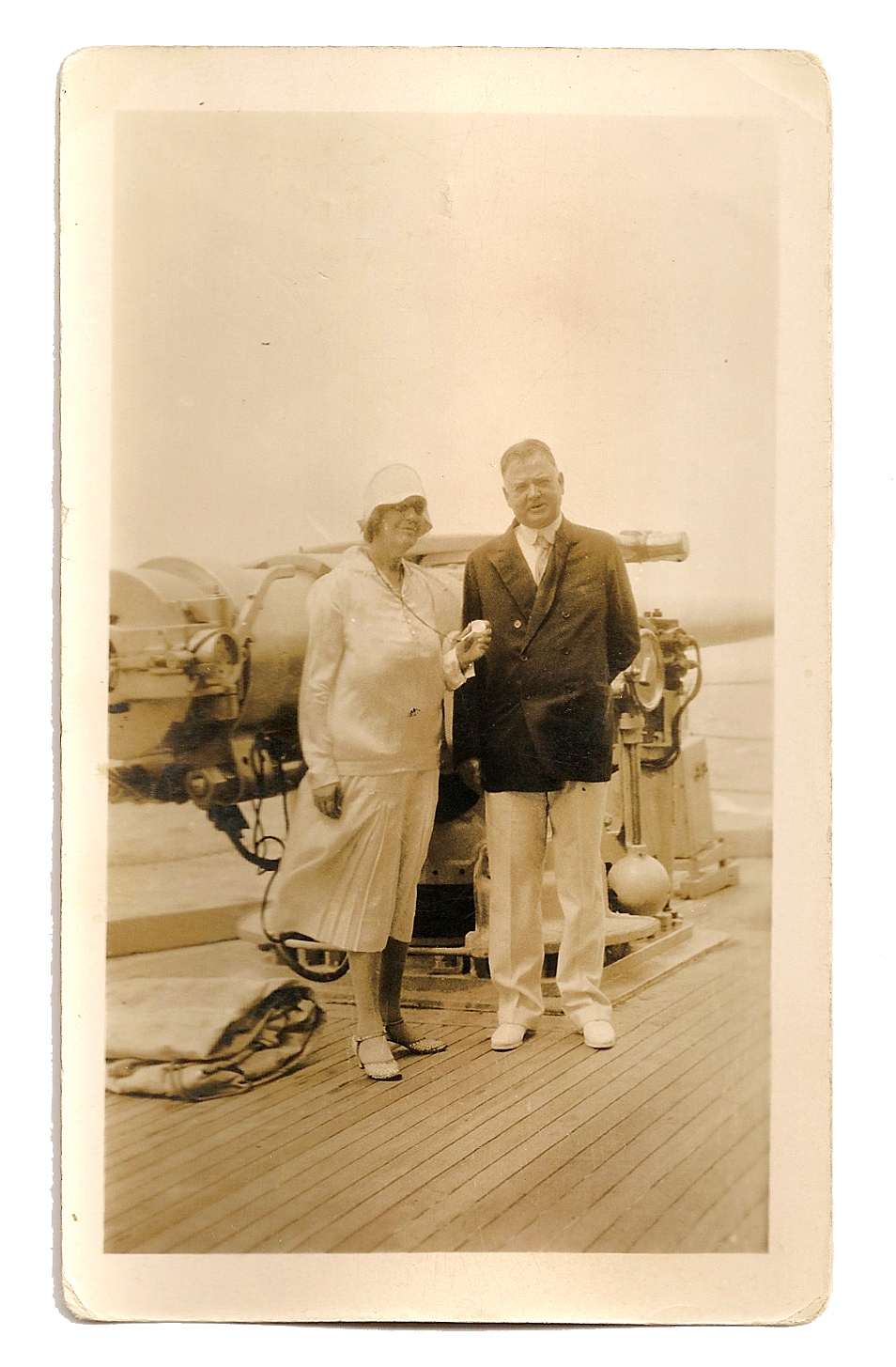
President-elect Hoover and his wife aboard the USS Utah in South America, December 1928

Before President-elect Hoover would take office, there was a nearly four-month transition period.

In November 1928, President-elect Hoover embarked on a ten-nation goodwill tour of Latin America. He delivered twenty-five speeches, stressing his plans to reduce American political and military interference in Latin American affairs. In sum, he pledged that the United States would act as a "good neighbor." While crossing the Andes from Chile, a plot to bomb Hoover's train as it crossed the vast Argentinian central plain was foiled.

== Inauguration ==
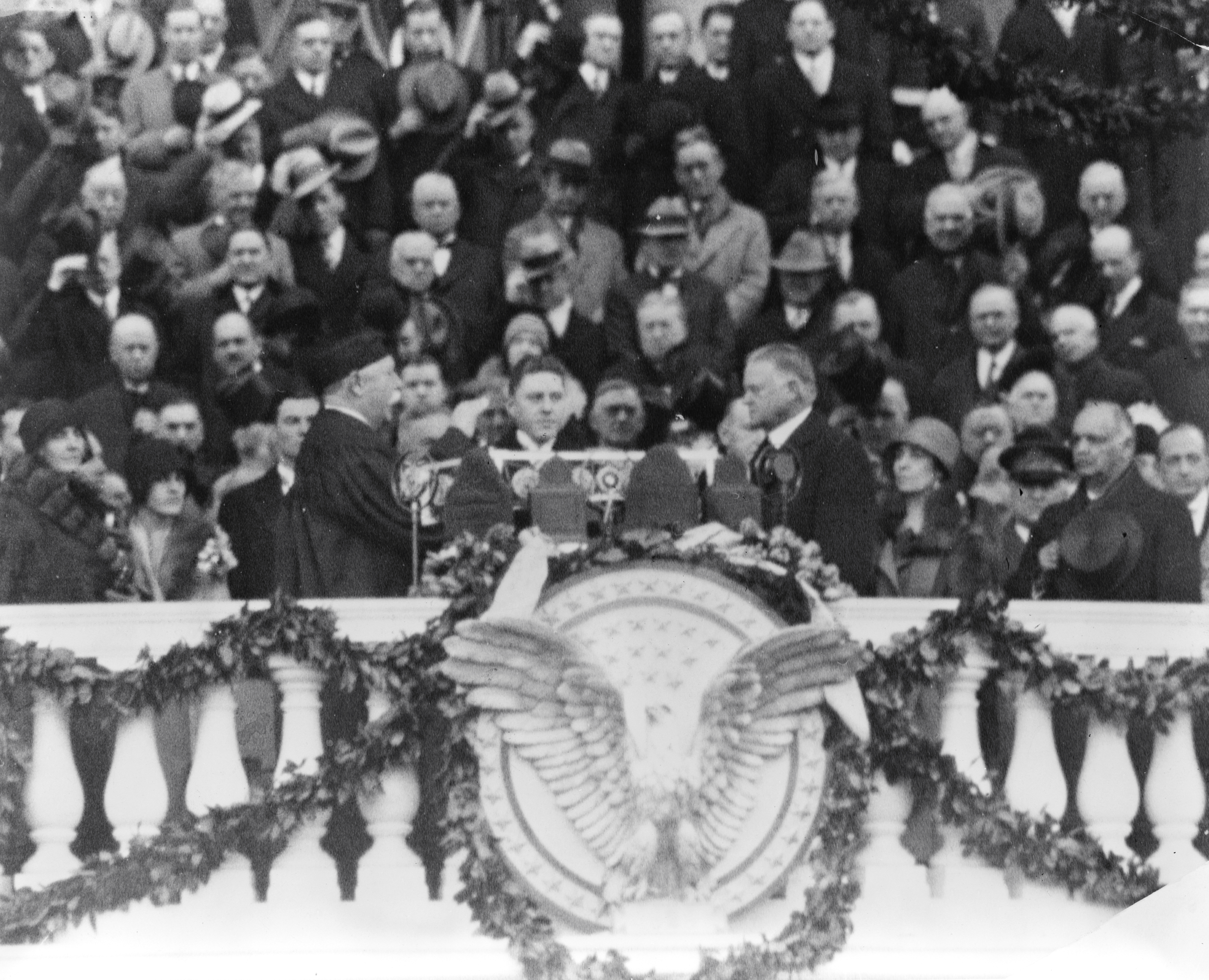
Inauguration of Hoover

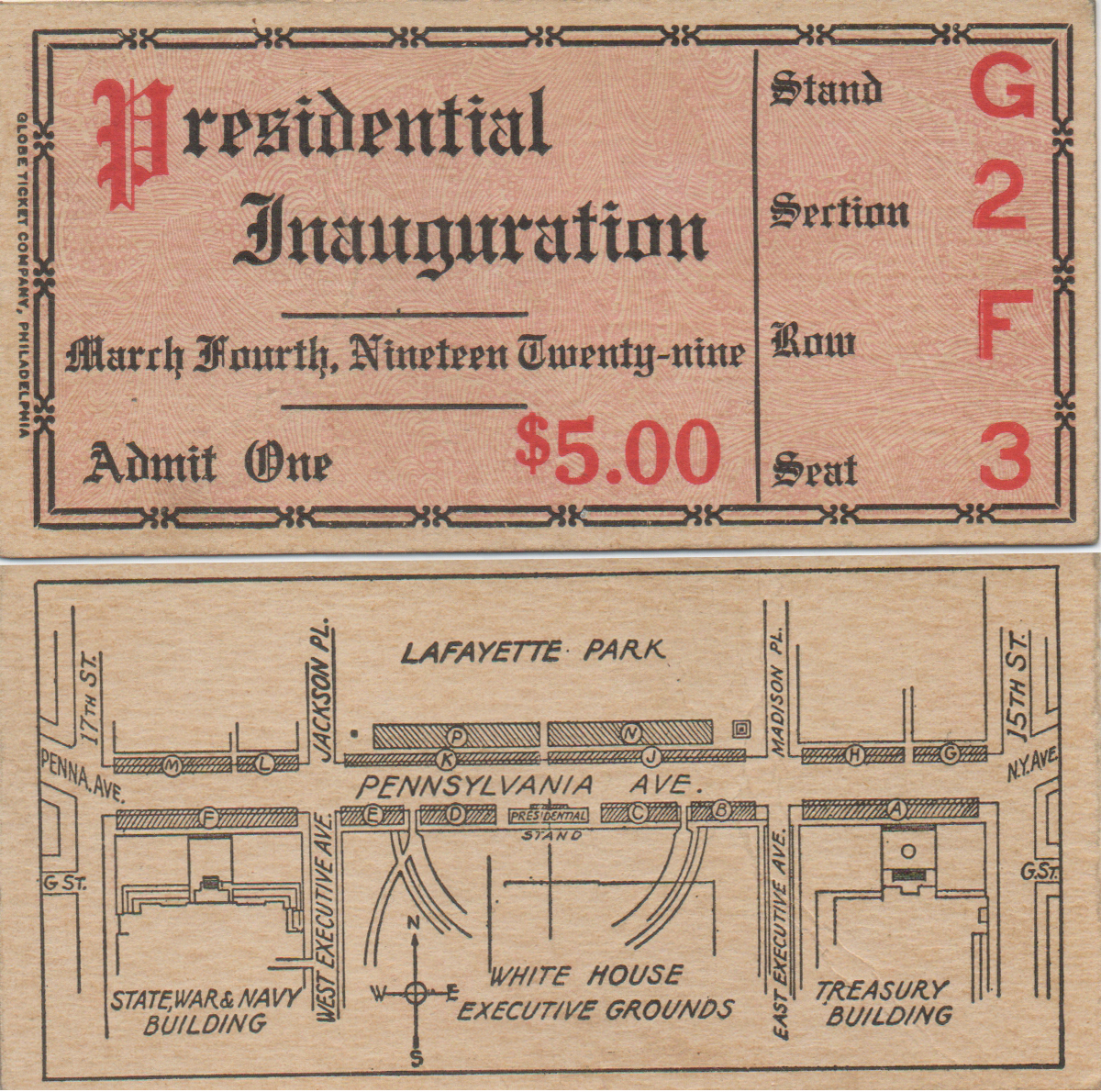
Inaugural parade ticket

Hoover was inaugurated as the nation's 31st president on March 4, 1929, on the East Portico of the United States Capitol. Chief Justice (and former president) William Howard Taft administered the oath of office. This was the first inaugural ceremony recorded by newsreel cameras. Hoover's inaugural address projected an optimistic tone throughout, even as he spoke about the "disregard and disobedience of law," which he considered "the most malign" problem confronting the nation.

Near the end of the speech he confidently observed:

Ours is a land rich in resources; stimulating in its glorious beauty; filled with millions of happy homes; blessed with comfort and opportunity. In no nation are the institutions of progress more advanced. In no nation are the fruits of accomplishment more secure. In no nation is the government more worthy of respect. No country is more loved by its people. I have an abiding faith in their capacity, integrity and high purpose. I have no fears for the future of our country. It is bright with hope.

These words would stand in stark contrast to the sense of desperation that would pervade the nation during much of his presidency.

The morning of the inauguration, the Coolidges had briefly met with the Hoovers in the Blue Room of the White House before departing for the United States Capitol for Hoover's inauguration.

== Administration ==
=== Cabinet ===
Hoover cabinet
Office	Name	Term
President	Herbert Hoover	1929–1933
Vice President	Charles Curtis	1929–1933
Secretary of State	Frank B. Kellogg	1929
Henry L. Stimson	1929–1933
Secretary of the Treasury	Andrew Mellon	1929–1932
Ogden L. Mills	1932–1933
Secretary of War	James W. Good	1929
Patrick J. Hurley	1929–1933
Attorney General	William D. Mitchell	1929–1933
Postmaster General	Walter Folger Brown	1929–1933
Secretary of the Navy	Charles Francis Adams III	1929–1933
Secretary of the Interior	Ray Lyman Wilbur	1929–1933
Secretary of Agriculture	Arthur M. Hyde	1929–1933
Secretary of Commerce	Robert P. Lamont	1929–1932
Roy D. Chapin	1932–1933
Secretary of Labor	James J. Davis	1929–1930
William N. Doak	1930–1933

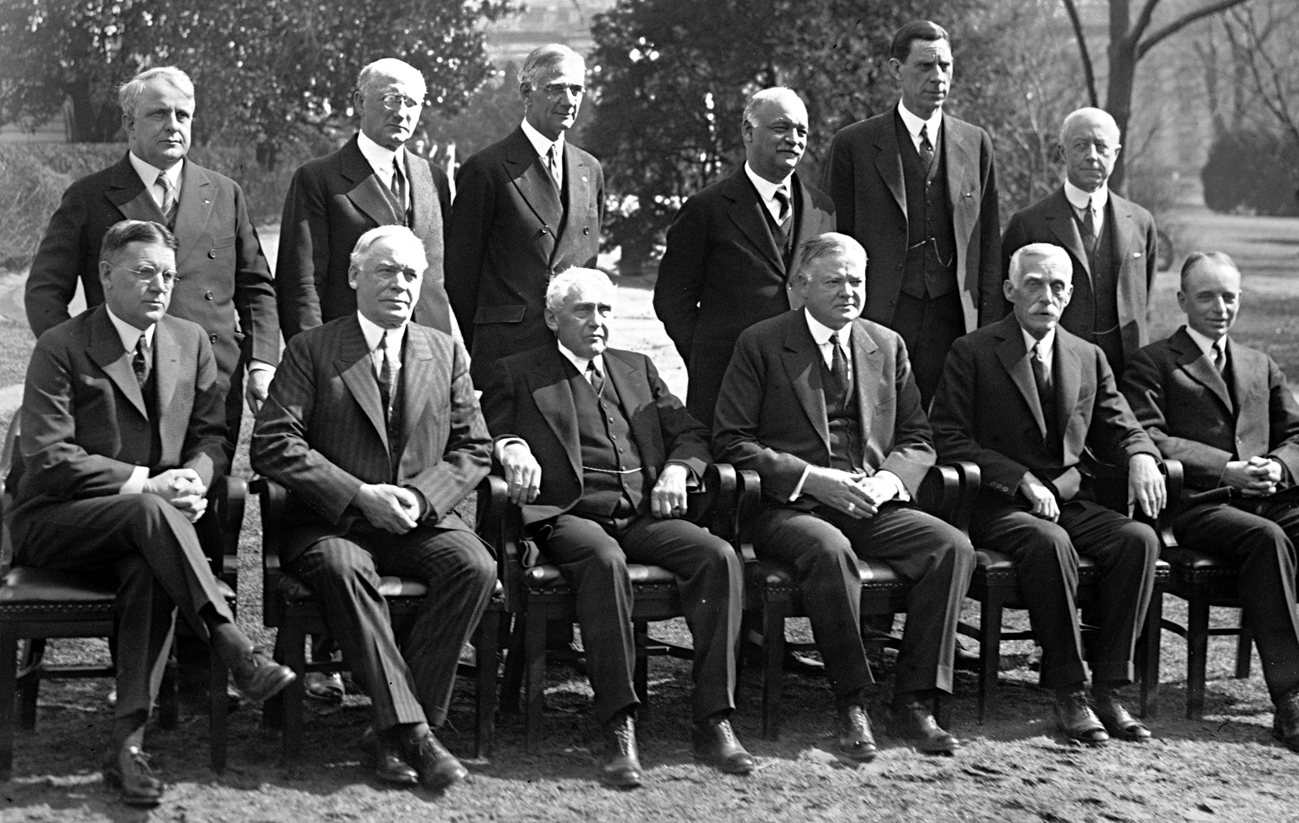
Hoover's cabinet

Hoover's cabinet consisted largely of wealthy, business-oriented conservatives. As the third consecutive Republican president to take office in the 1920s, Hoover retained many of the previous administration's personnel, including Secretary of Labor James J. Davis and Secretary of the Treasury Andrew Mellon. Hoover disliked Mellon, who maintained intense support among the party's Old Guard, and instead relied on Undersecretary of the Treasury Ogden L. Mills. Henry Stimson, the Governor-General of the Philippines and a former Secretary of War, became Hoover's Secretary of State.

After Hoover's old friend, Supreme Court Justice Harlan F. Stone declined to serve as Attorney General, Hoover promoted Solicitor General of the United States William D. Mitchell to the head the Justice Department. Hoover's first choice for Secretary of Agriculture was Charles McNary, author of the controversial McNary-Haugen Farm Relief Bill, which Hoover had strenuously opposed. The position instead went to Arthur M. Hyde, who was inexperienced regarding agricultural issues. For Secretary of the Navy, Hoover chose Charles Francis Adams III, a scion of the Adams political family who shared Hoover's views on disarmament. Hoover persuaded Ray Lyman Wilbur, the president of Stanford University, to serve as Secretary of the Interior. Businessman Robert P. Lamont became Secretary of Commerce, James William Good was appointed as Secretary of War, and Walter Folger Brown took the position of Postmaster General. Vice President Charles Curtis, who had previously opposed Hoover's nomination, had little influence with Hoover.

=== Press corps ===
Hoover held a press conference on his first day in office, promising a "new phase of press relations". He asked the group of journalists to elect a committee to recommend improvements to the White House press conference. Hoover declined to use a spokesman, instead asking reporters to directly quote him and giving them handouts with his statements ahead of time. In his first 120 days in office, he held more regular and frequent press conferences than any other president, before or since. However, he changed his press policies after the 1929 stock market crash, screening reporters and greatly reducing his availability.

== Judicial appointments ==
Hoover appointed three justices of the Supreme Court of the United States. He appointed Charles Evans Hughes to succeed Chief Justice William Howard Taft after the latter's death in 1930. A former associate justice, governor, Secretary of State, and presidential nominee, Hughes would lead the Hughes Court until 1941.

A second vacancy arose in 1930 due to the death of Edward Terry Sanford. Hoover's first nominee, federal appellate judge John J. Parker, was rejected by the Senate due to the opposition of the NAACP and labor groups. Hoover next nominated Owen Roberts, an attorney who had risen to prominence due to his role in investigating the Teapot Dome scandal. Roberts was confirmed by acclamation. Hughes and Roberts both established centrist reputations on the bench, and they often held the balance between their more conservative and more liberal colleagues during the 1930s.

In 1932, 91-year-old Associate Justice Oliver Wendell Holmes Jr. announced his retirement from the Court. George W. Norris, the Chairman of the Senate Judiciary Committee, insisted that Hoover nominate a progressive judge to succeed Holmes. Hoover nominated Benjamin Cardozo, the highly regarded chief judge of the New York Court of Appeals, and Cardozo was approved by the Senate in a unanimous vote. Cardozo joined with Louis Brandeis and Harlan F. Stone in forming a progressive block of Supreme Court justices known as the "Three Musketeers".

== Domestic affairs ==
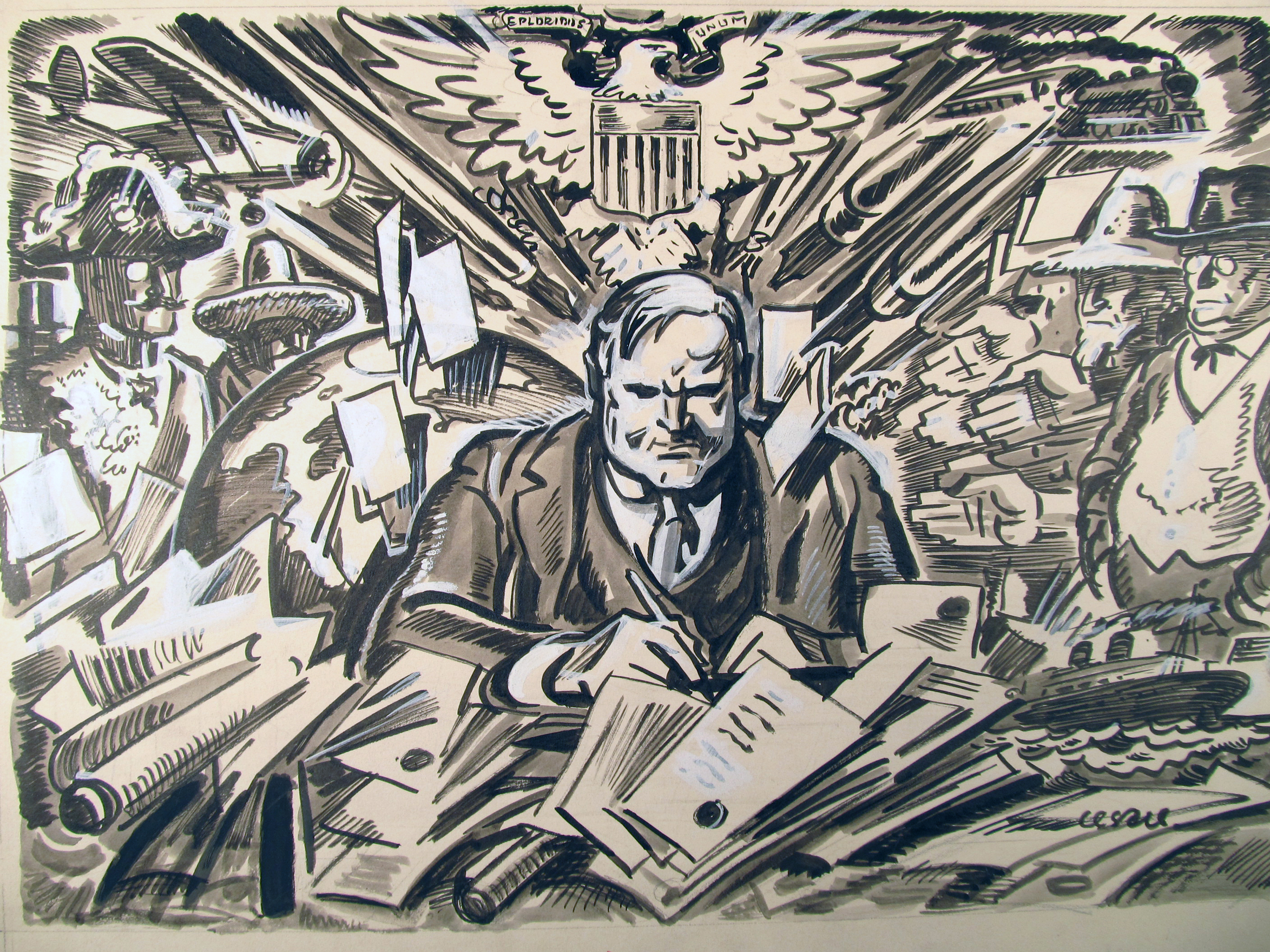
Herbert Hoover as the new President of the United States; original drawing for an Oscar Cesare political cartoon, March 17, 1929

Hoover saw the presidency as a vehicle for improving the conditions of all Americans by encouraging public-private cooperation—what he termed "volunteerism". He tended to oppose governmental coercion or intervention, as he thought they infringed on American ideals of individualism and self-reliance. He sought a balance among labor, capital, and the government, and he has been variously labeled a corporatist or associationalist. Hoover made extensive use of commissions to study issues and propose solutions, and many of those commissions were sponsored by private donors rather than by the government. One of the commissions started by Hoover, the Research Committee on Social Trends, was tasked with surveying the entirety of American society.

=== Agriculture ===
After taking office, Hoover called Congress into session in an attempt to address the farm crisis that had affected the country throughout much of the 1920s. Since the end of World War I, a glut of agricultural products on the world market had reduced the demand for American exports, resulting in domestic overproduction and a drop in prices. In June 1929, Hoover signed the Agricultural Marketing Act of 1929, which established the Federal Farm Board to stabilize farm prices. The act had been formulated by Coolidge's Secretary of Agriculture, William Marion Jardine, as an alternative to the McNary–Haugen Farm Relief Bill. The Agricultural Marketing Act authorized the Federal Farm Board to loan money to state and local cooperatives, which in turn would help farmers control crop prices by avoiding surpluses. Reflecting his desire to avoid statist solutions, Hoover successfully opposed other proposals, such as the McNary–Haugen bill, that would have directly subsidized farmers. During the special session of Congress in 1929, Hoover also sought to raise tariffs on agricultural products, but opposition from eastern senators delayed action on the tariff until 1930.

Hoover hoped that the Federal Farm Board would become the agricultural equivalent of the Federal Reserve Board, in that it would help control supply and production, especially during emergencies. With its emphasis on cooperation between business and government, the Federal Farm Board also reflected Hoover's general approach to governance. As the economy worsened in the 1930s, the Hoover administration and the Federal Farm Board struggled to stabilize farm prices, and Hoover continued to reject a stronger federal role. Federal Farm Board Chairman Alexander Legge and Secretary of Agriculture Hyde tried to convince farmers to voluntarily restrict their own production, but farmers were unwilling to do so. Prices for agricultural goods like wheat and cotton sank to new lows in the early 1930s, and Westerners also faced a period of severe drought and dust storms known as the Dust Bowl. Many of the Farm Board's proposals to address the ongoing economic crisis would later be adopted by the Roosevelt administration.

=== Great Depression ===
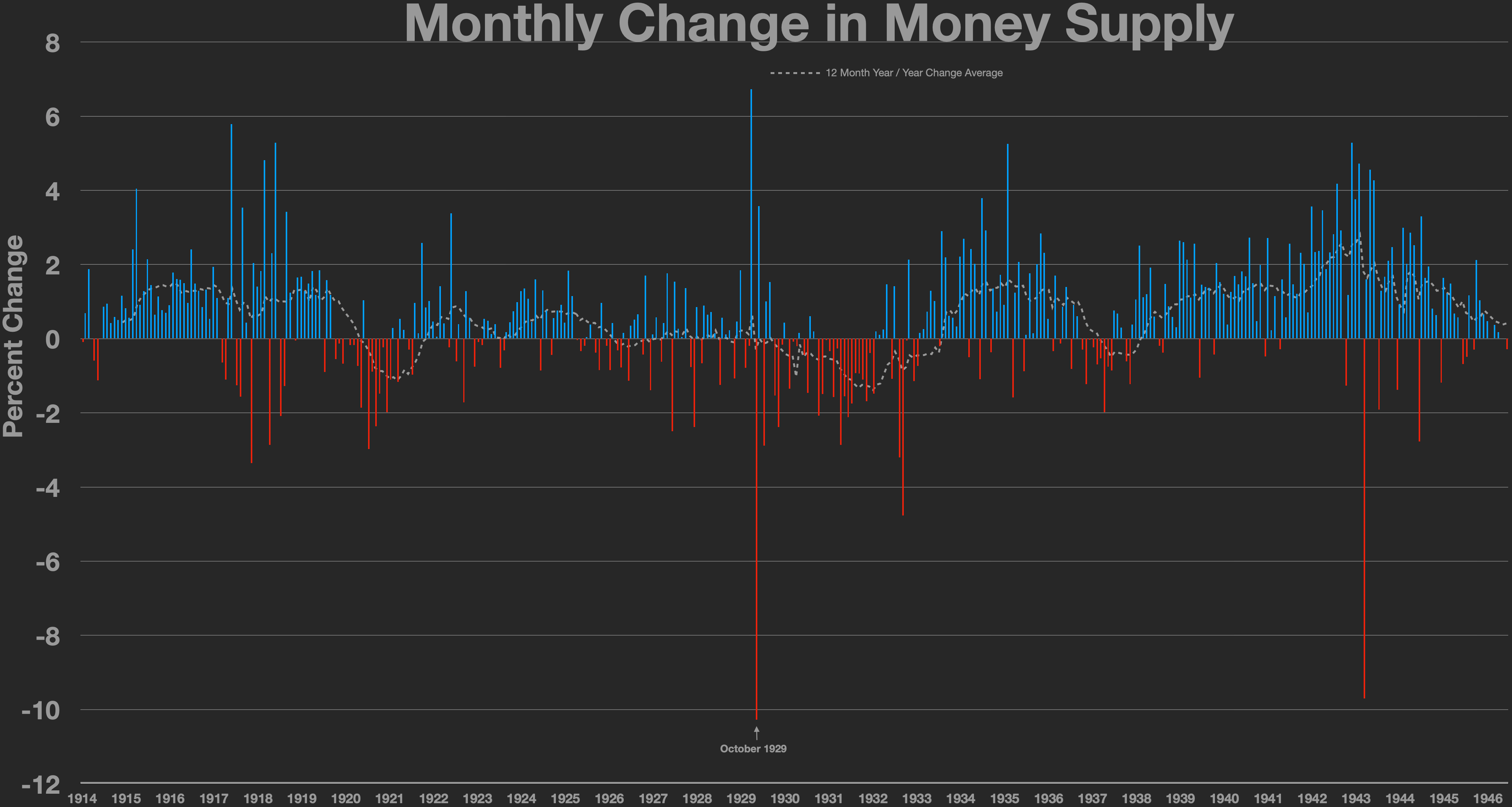
Total money supply contracted -10.28% in October 1929 and continued to contract for the next few years during Herbert Hoover's presidency

==== Onset ====
On taking office, Hoover said that "[g]iven the chance to go forward with the policies of the last eight years, we shall soon with the help of God, be in sight of the day when poverty will be banished from this nation." Hoover hoped that coordination among business, labor, and consumers could bring an end to the business cycle and allow for sustained and predictable economic growth. Having seen the fruits of prosperity brought by technological progress, many shared Hoover's optimism, and the already bullish stock market climbed even higher on Hoover's accession. This optimism concealed several threats to sustained U.S. economic growth, including the persistent farm crisis, a saturation of consumer goods like automobiles, growing income inequality, an uneasy international situation, and the consolidation of various industries due to weak enforcement of antitrust law.

Most dangerous of all to the economy, excessive speculation had raised stock prices far beyond their value. Banks played a major role in enabling this speculation, as by 1929 commercial banks were loaning more money for investments in real estate or the stock market than for commercial enterprises. Some regulators and bankers, like George L. Harrison and George Fisher Baker, recognized the danger that speculation posed to the economy, and in 1927 Baker had warned Coolidge and Hoover that a failure to curb speculation would lead to "one of the greatest financial catastrophes that this country has ever seen." President Hoover was reluctant to become involved with the workings of the Federal Reserve System, and bankers like Charles E. Mitchell continued to encourage speculative practices. In late October 1929, the Wall Street Crash of 1929 occurred, and the worldwide economy began to spiral downward into the Great Depression.

The causes of the Great Depression remain a matter of debate, but Hoover viewed a lack of confidence in the financial system as the fundamental economic problem facing the nation. He sought to avoid direct federal intervention, believing that the best way to bolster the economy was through the strengthening of businesses such as banks and railroads. He also feared that allowing individuals on the "dole" would permanently weaken the country. Instead, Hoover strongly believed that local governments and private giving should address the needs of individuals.

==== Early response ====
Though he attempted to put a positive spin on Black Tuesday, Hoover moved quickly to address the stock market collapse. In the days following Black Tuesday, Hoover gathered business and labor leaders, asking them to avoid wage cuts and work stoppages while the country faced what he believed would be a short recession similar to the Depression of 1920–21. Hoover also convinced railroads and public utilities to increase spending on construction and maintenance, while the Federal Reserve announced that it would cut interest rates. These actions were collectively designed to prevent a cycle of deflation and provide a fiscal stimulus.

In early 1930, Hoover acquired from Congress an additional $100 million to continue the Federal Farm Board lending and purchasing policies. At the end of 1929, the FFB established the National Wool Marketing Corporation (NWMC), a national wool cooperative made up of 30 state associations. Hoover also supported new public works projects, although his fear of budget deficits led him to oppose expansive projects such as that contemplated by the Muscle Shoals Bill, which sought to establish government production and distribution of power in the Tennessee Valley. In late 1930, Hoover established the President's Organization for Unemployment Relief, which issued press releases urging companies to hire workers.

Hoover had taken office hoping to raise agricultural tariffs in order to help farmers reeling from the farm crisis of the 1920s, but his attempt to raise agricultural tariffs became connected with attempts to raise tariffs for other goods. After months of debate, Congress produced a bill that raised the average import duties on agricultural products from 38 percent to 49 percent and average import duties on industrial products from 31 percent to 34 percent. In June 1930, over the objection of many economists, Congress approved and Hoover reluctantly signed into law the Smoot–Hawley Tariff Act. The intent of the act was to encourage the purchase of American-made products by increasing the cost of imported goods, while raising revenue for the federal government and protecting farmers. However, economic depression had spread worldwide, and Canada, France, and other nations retaliated by raising tariffs, resulting in a contraction of international trade and a worsening of the Depression. Progressive Republicans such as Senator William Borah were outraged when Hoover signed the tariff act, and Hoover's relations with that wing of the party never recovered. By the end of 1930, the national unemployment rate had reached 11.9 percent, but it was not yet clear to most Americans that the economic downturn would be worse than the Depression of 1920–21.

==== 1930 midterm elections ====
The 1930 midterm elections saw Republicans lose control of the House and narrowly retain control of the Senate. John Nance Garner, the incoming Democratic leader in the House of Representatives, emerged as perhaps the most influential individual in Congress. The election was also a victory for progressives of both parties, as Republicans closely aligned with Hoover lost several congressional elections. Additionally, New York Governor Franklin D. Roosevelt's landslide re-election established him as the front-runner for the 1932 Democratic nomination. Despite the election defeat, Hoover refused to change his policies, rejecting the Chairman of the Committee on Employment's advice to appropriate additional money for public works. Instead, Hoover's first State of the Union address after the election called for a balancing of the budget. Hoover also refused to call a special session of Congress after the election, leaving the 72nd Congress in recess from March 1931 to December 1931.

==== Later response ====
A series of bank failures in late 1930 heralded a larger collapse of the economy in 1931. Bank failures continued in 1931 as foreign investors withdrew money from the United States, and the Federal Reserve raised interest rates in order to prevent outflow of gold. While other countries left the gold standard, Hoover refused to abandon it; he derided any other monetary system as "collectivism." By mid-1931, the unemployment rate had reached 15 percent, giving rise to growing fears that the country was experiencing a depression far worse than recent economic downturns.

Millions of Americans became homeless as the economy crumbled, and hundreds of shanty towns and homeless encampments sprang up across the country. A reserved man with a fear of public speaking, Hoover allowed his opponents in the Democratic Party to define him as cold, incompetent, reactionary, and out-of-touch. Hoover's opponents developed defamatory epithets to discredit him such as: "Hooverville" (the shanty towns and homeless encampments), "Hoover leather" (cardboard used to cover holes in the soles of shoes), and "Hoover blanket" (old newspaper used to cover oneself from the cold). Hoover also faced criticism from progressive Republicans like Governor Gifford Pinchot of Pennsylvania, who urged Hoover to call Congress into a special session to approve relief measures before the winter of 1931–1932. Rather than calling Congress into a special session, Hoover created the National Credit Corporation, a voluntary association of bankers, but the organization did not manage to save banks or ease credit as Hoover had hoped it would.

As the Great Depression continued, Hoover finally heeded calls for more direct federal intervention, though he vetoed a bill that would have allowed direct federal lending to individuals. When the 72nd Congress convened in December 1931, Hoover proposed the establishment of the Reconstruction Finance Corporation (RFC). Though some progressives criticized the bill as a bailout for banking interests that was insufficient to address the economic crisis, Congress passed a bill to create the RFC in January 1932. The RFC's initial goal was to provide government-secured loans to financial institutions, railroads, and local governments. The RFC saved numerous businesses from failure, but it failed to stimulate commercial lending as Hoover had hoped, partly because it was run by conservative bankers unwilling to make riskier loans. The RFC would be adopted by Roosevelt and greatly expanded as part of his New Deal.

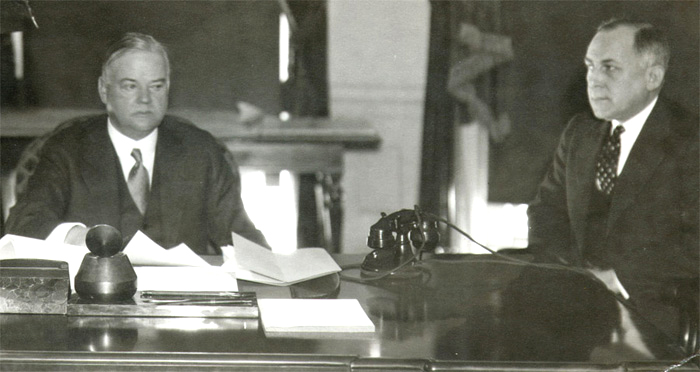
Herbert Hoover in the Oval Office with press secretary Ted Joslin, 1932

The economy continued to worsen, with unemployment rates nearing 23 percent in early 1932. With the RFC unable to stem the economic crisis, Hoover signed the Emergency Relief and Construction Act, a $2 billion public works bill, in July 1932. That same month, Hoover signed the Federal Home Loan Bank Act, establishing 12 district banks overseen by a Federal Home Loan Bank Board in a manner similar to the Federal Reserve System. Hoover and Senator Carter Glass, another gold standard proponent, recognized that they needed to stop deflation by encouraging lending. Hoover was instrumental in passing the Glass–Steagall Act of 1932, which allowed for prime rediscounting at the Federal Reserve, in turn allowing further inflation of credit and bank reserves.

=== Taxes and deficits ===
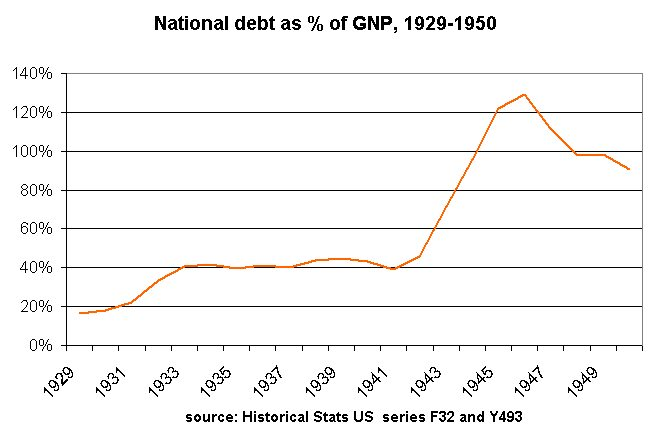
National debt as a fraction of GNP up from 20% to 40% under Hoover. From Historical Statistics US (1976)

Though some economists, like William Trufant Foster, favored deficit spending to address the Great Depression, most politicians and economists believed in the necessity of keeping a balanced budget. Hoover shared this belief, and he sought to avoid a budget deficit through greatly increased tax rates on the wealthy. To pay for government programs and to make up for revenue lost due to the Depression, Hoover signed the Revenue Act of 1932. The act increased taxes across the board, so that top earners were taxed at 63 percent on their net income, up from 25 percent when Hoover took office. The 1932 Act also increased the tax on the net income of corporations from 12 percent to 13.75 percent. Additionally, under Hoover, the estate tax was doubled, corporate taxes were raised by almost 15 percent, and a "check tax" took effect, placing a two-cent tax on all bank checks. Economists William D. Lastrapes and George Selgin conclude that the check tax was "an important contributing factor to that period's severe monetary contraction". Despite the passage of the Revenue Act, the federal government continued to run a budget deficit.

=== Labor ===
Hoover believed that amicable business-labor relations were an important component of a prosperous economy. In 1931, Hoover signed the Davis–Bacon Act, which required a maximum eight-hour day on construction of public buildings, as well as the payment of at least the local "prevailing wage". The following year, he signed the Norris–La Guardia Act, which banned yellow-dog contracts, created a positive right of noninterference by employers against workers joining trade unions, and barred the federal courts from issuing injunctions against nonviolent labor disputes. Though Hoover had originally tried to stop the bill, he chose to sign it into law as he feared that Congress would simply override a veto.

=== Prohibition ===
The United States banned the production, importation, transportation, and sale of alcoholic beverages nationwide in 1920 following the ratification of the Eighteenth Amendment. In his 1929 inaugural address, Hoover, in addressing enforcement of Prohibition laws said, "If citizens do not like a law, their duty as honest men and women is to discourage its violation; their right is openly to work for its repeal." Hoover increased federal enforcement of Prohibition by signing the Increased Penalties Act, which made even minor liquor violations felonies. Hoover also established the Wickersham Commission to make public policy recommendations regarding Prohibition. The commission found widespread corruption and violations of Prohibition, and its exposure of brutal practices such as the "third degree" sparked outrage and helped lead to the reform of many police forces.

As public opinion increasingly turned against Prohibition, more and more people flouted the law, and several states repealed state bans on alcoholic beverages. Though he recognized the change in public opinion, Hoover insisted that federal and state authorities continue to uphold Prohibition. A grassroots movement began working in earnest for Prohibition's repeal, supported by numerous organizations, such as the Association Against the Prohibition Amendment. A constitutional amendment repealing the Eighteenth Amendment was approved by Congress on January 23, 1933, and submitted to state ratifying conventions in each state for ratification. By December 1933, it had been ratified by the requisite number of states to become the Twenty-first Amendment.

=== Civil rights and Mexican Repatriation ===
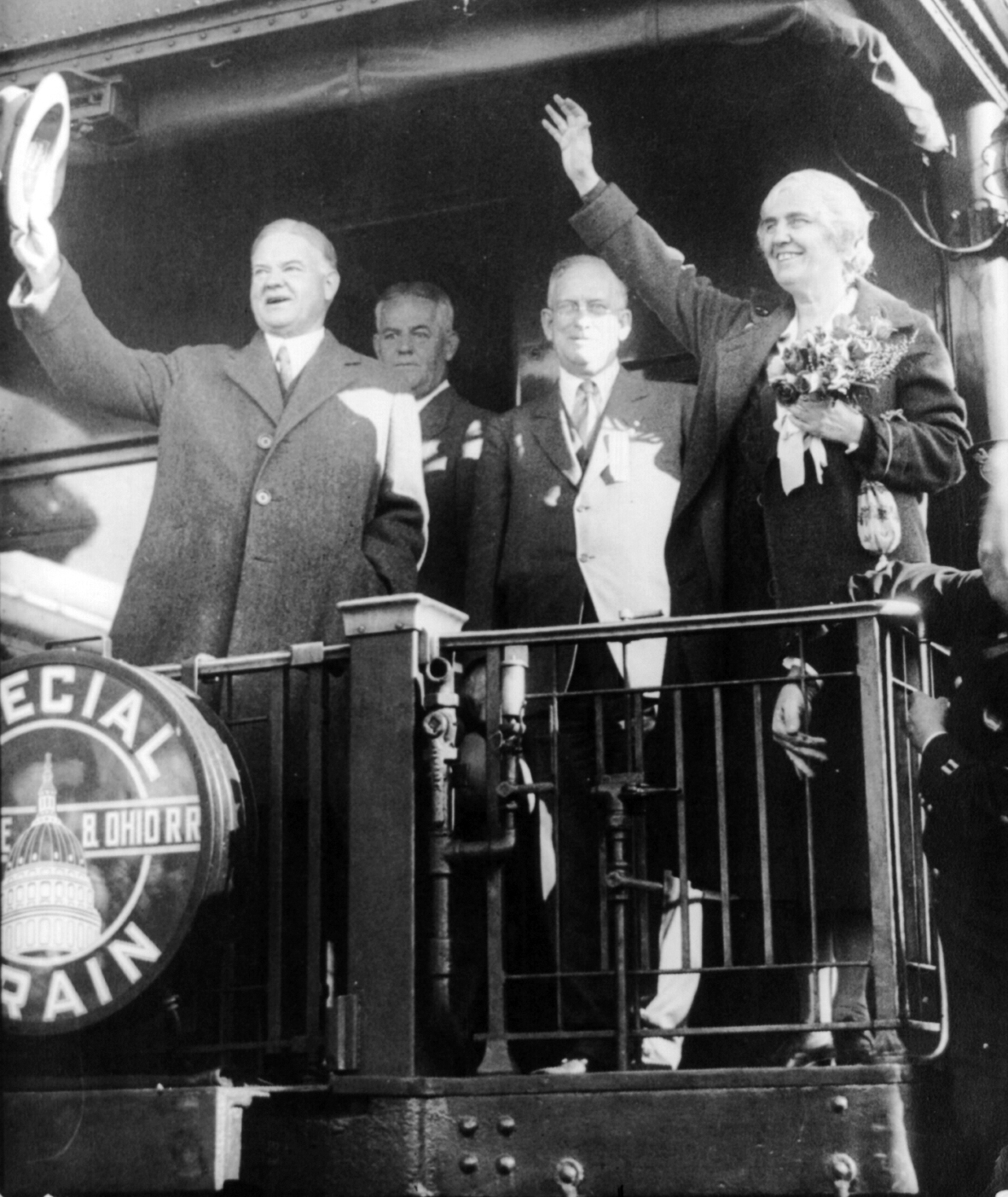
Herbert and Lou Henry Hoover aboard a train in Illinois

Hoover seldom mentioned civil rights throughout his presidency. He believed that African Americans and other races could improve themselves with education and individual initiative. Hoover appointed more African Americans to federal positions than Harding and Coolidge had combined, but many African-American leaders condemned various aspects of the Hoover administration, including Hoover's unwillingness to push for a federal anti-lynching law. Hoover also continued to pursue the lily-white strategy, removing African Americans from positions of leadership in the Republican Party in an attempt to end the Democratic Party's dominance in the South. Though Robert Moton and some other black leaders accepted the lily-white strategy as a temporary measure, most African-American leaders were outraged. Hoover further alienated black leaders by nominating conservative Southern judge John J. Parker to the Supreme Court; Parker's nomination ultimately failed in the Senate due to opposition from the NAACP and organized labor. Many black voters switched to the Democratic Party in the 1932 election, and African Americans would later become an important part of Franklin Roosevelt's New Deal coalition.

As part of his efforts to limit unemployment, Hoover sought to cut immigration to the United States, and in 1930 he promulgated an executive order requiring individuals to have employment before migrating to the United States. With the goal of opening up more jobs for U.S. citizens, Secretary of Labor William N. Doak began a campaign to prosecute illegal immigrants in the United States. Though Doak did not seek to deport one specific group of immigrants, his campaign most strongly affected Mexican Americans, especially Mexican Americans living in Southern California. Many of the deportations were overseen by state and local authorities who acted on the encouragement of Doak and the Department of Labor. From 1930 to 1932, between 355,000 and one million were repatriated or deported to Mexico; approximately forty to sixty percent of those repatriated were birthright citizens – overwhelmingly children. Voluntary repatriation was much more common during the repatriations than formal deportation. Some scholars contend that the unprecedented number of deportations between 1929 and 1933 were part of an “explicit Hoover administration policy". At least 82,000 of those repatriated were formally deported by the federal government, including 34,000 deported to Mexico between 1930 and 1933. According to legal professor Kevin R. Johnson, the repatriation campaign meets the modern legal standards of ethnic cleansing, arguing that it involved the forced removal of an ethnic minority by government actors.

Charles Curtis, the nation's first Native American Vice President, and the first person with acknowledged non-European ancestry, was from the Kaw tribe in Kansas. Hoover's humanitarian and Quaker reputation, along with Curtis as a vice-president, gave special meaning to his Indian policies. His Quaker upbringing influenced his views that Native Americans needed to achieve economic self-sufficiency. As president, he appointed Charles J. Rhoads as commissioner of Indian affairs. Hoover supported Rhoads' commitment to Indian assimilation and sought to minimize the federal role in Indian affairs. His goal was to have Indians acting as individuals (not as tribes) and to assume the responsibilities of citizenship granted with the Indian Citizenship Act of 1924.

=== Bonus Army ===
Thousands of World War I veterans and their families demonstrated and camped out in Washington, DC, during June 1932, calling for immediate payment of bonuses that had been promised by the World War Adjusted Compensation Act in 1924; the terms of the act called for payment of the bonuses in 1945. Although offered money by Congress to return home, some members of the "Bonus Army" remained. Washington police attempted to disperse the demonstrators, but they were outnumbered and unsuccessful. Shots were fired by the police in a futile attempt to attain order, and two protesters were killed while many officers were injured. Hoover sent U.S. Army forces led by General Douglas MacArthur to the protests. MacArthur, believing he was fighting a Communist revolution, chose to clear out the camp with military force. Though Hoover had not ordered MacArthur's clearing out of the protesters, he endorsed it after the fact. The incident proved embarrassing for the Hoover administration, and destroyed any remaining chance he had of winning re-election.

=== Twentieth Amendment ===
Article I, Section 4, Clause 2 of the Constitution states that Congress must meet at least once per year, on the first Monday in December, though Congress could by law set another date and the president could summon special sessions. The original text of the Constitution set a duration for the terms of federal elected officials, but not the specific dates on which those terms would begin or end. From 1789 until the early 1930s, presidential and congressional terms began on March 4. The result of these scheduling decisions was that there was a long, four-month lame duck period between the election and inauguration of the president. As regular congressional sessions did not begin until December of each year, there was often a long lame duck session following the election, followed by a long period of congressional inactivity.

Efforts to change these dates through a constitutional amendment began in the late 1920s. In March 1932, Congress approved a constitutional amendment moving the beginning and ending of the terms of the president and vice president from March 4 to January 20, and of members of Congress from March 4 to January 3. The amendment also specified procedures for cases in which the president-elect dies or otherwise fails to qualify. By January 23, 1933, the amendment had been ratified by the requisite number of states to become the Twentieth Amendment. Roosevelt's second inauguration in 1937 was the first presidential inauguration to take place on the new date.

=== White House fire ===
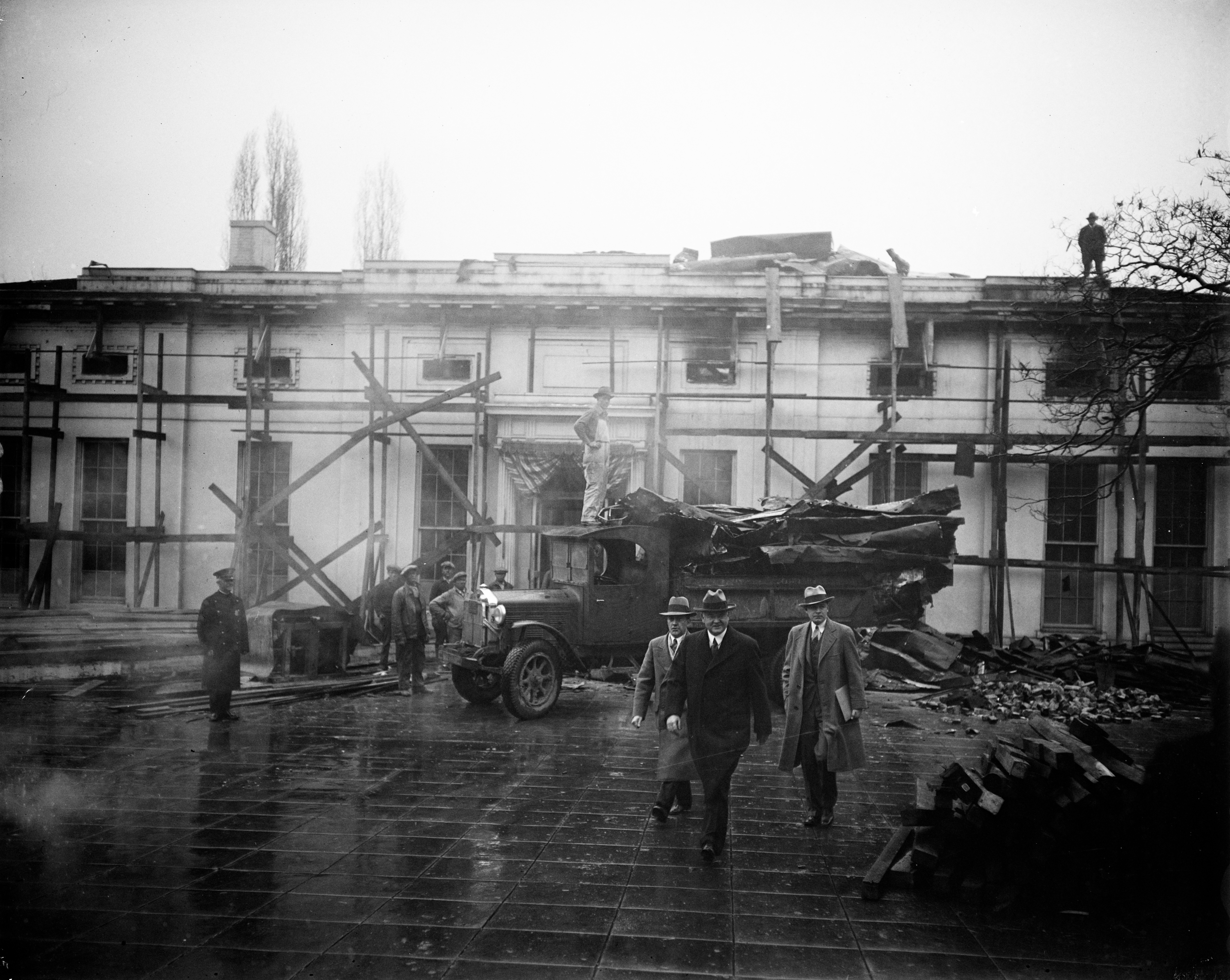
President Hoover views West Wing fire ruins 15 January 1930 cropped

Knob and tube wiring

On Christmas Eve of the first year of the new Herbert Hoover administration a fire broke out in the white house West Wing, the culprit later investigation showed was faulty knob and tube wiring, combined with flammable paper materials in the attic. The fire burned extensively, and during the freezing cold December temperatures only a few items could be saved, the President's desk was carried out by Secret Service. The blaze caused four months repair worth of damage.

== Foreign affairs ==
In the midst of a worldwide depression, Hoover and Secretary of State Henry Stimson became more closely involved in world affairs than Hoover's Republican predecessors had been. According to William Leuchtenburg, Hoover was "the last American president to take office with no conspicuous need to pay attention to the rest of the world." But during Hoover's term, the world order established with the 1919 Treaty of Versailles began to crumble.

=== Multilateral agreements ===
Though the United States remained outside of the League of Nations, Hoover showed a willingness to work within multilateral structures. Hoover pursued United States membership in the Permanent Court of International Justice, but the Senate never voted on his proposal. The Senate also defeated Hoover's proposed Saint Lawrence Seaway Treaty with Canada.

Hoover placed a priority on disarmament, which he hoped would allow the United States to shift money from the military to domestic needs. Hoover and Stimson focused on extending the 1922 Washington Naval Treaty, which sought to prevent a naval arms race. A previous effort to extend the Washington Naval Treaty, the Geneva Naval Conference, had failed to produce results, but the Hoover administration convinced the British to re-open negotiations. In 1930, the United States and other major naval powers signed the London Naval Treaty. The treaty represented the first time that the naval powers had agreed to cap their tonnage of auxiliary vessels (previous agreements had focused on capital ships), but the treaty did not include France or Italy. The treaty provoked a nationalist backlash in Japan due to its reconfirmation of the "5–5–3" ratio which limited Japan to a smaller fleet than the United States or the United Kingdom. At the 1932 World Disarmament Conference, Hoover urged worldwide cutbacks in armaments and the outlawing of tanks and bombers, but his proposals were not adopted.

=== Reparations ===
When Hoover took office, an international committee meeting in Paris promulgated the Young Plan, which created the Bank for International Settlements and stipulated the partial forgiveness of German World War I reparations. Hoover was wary of agreeing to the plan, as he feared that it would be linked to reduced payments on loans the U.S. extended to France and Britain in World War I. He ultimately agreed to support the proposal at the urging of Owen D. Young, the American industrialist who chaired the committee. Due to the severe effects of the Great Depression on its economy, Germany was unable to pay reparations under the Young Plan's schedule. In response, Hoover issued the Hoover Moratorium, a one-year halt on Allied war loans conditional on a suspension of German reparations payments. Hoover also made American bankers agree to refrain from demanding payment on private loans from Germans. Hoover hoped that the moratorium would help stabilize the European economy, which he viewed as a major cause of economic troubles in the United States. As the moratorium neared its expiration the following year, an attempt to find a permanent solution was made at the Lausanne Conference of 1932. The agreement reached there was not approved by any of the affected countries because acceptance was provisional on the United States cancelling the war debts owed to it, and that did not happen. Reparations payments as a result virtually stopped.

=== Latin America ===
As president, Hoover largely made good on his pledge made prior to assuming office not to interfere in Latin America's internal affairs. In 1930, he released the Clark Memorandum, a rejection of the Roosevelt Corollary and a move towards non-interventionism in Latin America. Hoover did not completely refrain from the use of the military in Latin American affairs; he thrice threatened intervention in the Dominican Republic, and he sent warships to El Salvador to support the government against a left-wing revolution. But he wound down the Banana Wars, ending the occupation of Nicaragua and nearly bringing an end to the occupation of Haiti. Franklin Roosevelt's Good Neighbor policy would continue the trend towards non-interventionism in Latin America.

=== Affairs in the Pacific ===
In 1931, Japan invaded Manchuria, defeating the Republic of China's military forces and establishing Manchukuo, a puppet state. The Hoover administration deplored the invasion, but also sought to avoid antagonizing the Japanese, fearing that taking too strong of a stand would weaken the moderate forces in the Japanese government. Hoover also viewed the Japanese as a potential ally against the Soviet Union, which he saw as a much greater threat. In response to the Japanese invasion, Hoover and Secretary of State Stimson outlined the Stimson Doctrine, which held that the United States would not recognize territories gained by force. The Hoover administration based this declaration on the 1928 Kellogg–Briand Pact, in which several nations (including Japan and the United States) renounced war and promised to peacefully solve disputes. In the aftermath of invasion of Manchuria, Stimson and other members of the Cabinet came to believe that war with Japan might be inevitable, though Hoover continued to push for disarmament among the world powers.

The United States had taken control of the Philippines after the Spanish–American War of 1898, and the islands remained a possession of the United States despite a vigorous independence movement. Stimson convinced Hoover to oppose independence on the grounds that it would hurt the Philippine economy.

== Election of 1932 ==
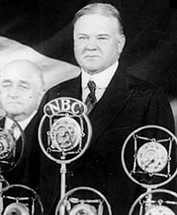
Hoover addresses a large crowd in his 1932 campaign.

Between 1928 and 1932, the gross national product dropped by 30 percent, and by mid-1931 few observers thought that Hoover had much hope of winning a second term. Despite the economic calamity facing the nation and his dim hopes for re-election, Hoover faced little opposition for re-nomination at the 1932 Republican National Convention. Some Republicans talked of nominating Coolidge, former Vice President Charles Dawes, Senator Hiram Johnson, or Governor Gifford Pinchot, but all passed on the opportunity to challenge Hoover. Franklin D. Roosevelt won the presidential nomination on the fourth ballot of the 1932 Democratic National Convention, defeating the 1928 Democratic nominee, Al Smith. By 1932, the radio was in 12 million homes, changing the nature of presidential campaigns. No longer could presidents change the content of their speeches for each audience; anyone with a radio could listen to every major speech.

1932 electoral vote results

Hoover originally planned to make only one or two major speeches, and to leave the rest of the campaigning to proxies, as sitting presidents had traditionally done. However, encouraged by Republican pleas and outraged by Democratic claims, Hoover entered the public fray. In his nine major radio addresses Hoover primarily defended his administration and his philosophy of government. Hoover urged voters to hold to the "foundations of experience," rejecting the notion that government interventionism could save the country from the Depression. In his campaign trips around the country, Hoover was faced with perhaps the most hostile crowds of any sitting president. At campaign stops he was frequently heckled and booed, and in Beloit, Wisconsin a man was arrested on charges that he had removed spikes from the rail line in advance of Hoover's train. Observed one member of the Secret Service, "I've been traveling with Presidents since Roosevelt and never before have I seen one actually booed, with men running out into the street to thumb their noses at him."

The Democrats attacked Hoover as the cause of the Great Depression, and for being indifferent to the suffering of millions. As Governor of New York, Roosevelt had called on the New York legislature to provide aid for the needy, establishing Roosevelt's reputation for being more favorable toward government interventionism during the economic crisis. Fausold rejects the notion that the two nominees were similar ideologically, pointing to differences between the two on federal spending on public works, agricultural issues, Prohibition, and the tariff. The Democratic Party, including Al Smith and other national leaders, coalesced behind Roosevelt, while progressive Republicans like George Norris and Robert La Follette Jr. deserted Hoover.

Hoover's attempts to vindicate his administration fell on deaf ears, as much of the public blamed his administration for the depression. Roosevelt won 57.4 percent of the popular vote compared to Hoover's 39.7 percent. Hoover's popular vote was reduced by 26 percentage points from his result in the 1928 election, while Roosevelt became the first Democratic presidential nominee to win a majority of the popular vote since 1876, and won a larger percentage of the vote than any Democrat before him since the party's founding in 1828. In the electoral vote, Hoover lost 59–472, carrying only six Northeastern states. In the concurrent congressional election, the Democrats extended their control over the House and gained control of the Senate, giving them unified control of the legislative and executive branches for the first time since the 1918 elections. The election marked the end of the Fourth Party System and the beginning of the Fifth Party System. The Republicans would not regain control of either house of Congress until 1947, and the Democrats would retain the presidency until 1953.

== Post–election period ==
As Hoover's term extended until March 1933, he held office for several months after his defeat in the November 1932 election. During that period, the domestic banking system and the international situation continued to worsen. Adolf Hitler took power in Germany, Japan announced its intention to leave the League of Nations, and the British requested that they be allowed to suspend payments on World War I debts. Hoover was interested in linking debt cancellation to disarmament, but debt cancellation was extremely unpopular in much of the United States. He proposed that Roosevelt join him in negotiating an agreement to cancel the war debts, but Roosevelt, who viewed the causes of the Great Depression as primarily domestic in nature, refused to become involved. Hoover and Roosevelt met twice in the period between the election and Roosevelt's inauguration, but they were unable to agree on any united action to combat the Depression. In mid-February 1933, Hoover sought to convince Roosevelt to issue a public statement endorsing Hoover's policies for ending the Depression, but Roosevelt refused to do so. That same month, Roosevelt survived an assassination attempt; the bullets meant for Roosevelt killed Mayor Anton Cermak of Chicago. Hoover continued to unsuccessfully lobby Roosevelt regarding economic policy until Roosevelt took office on March 4, 1933.

== Historical reputation ==
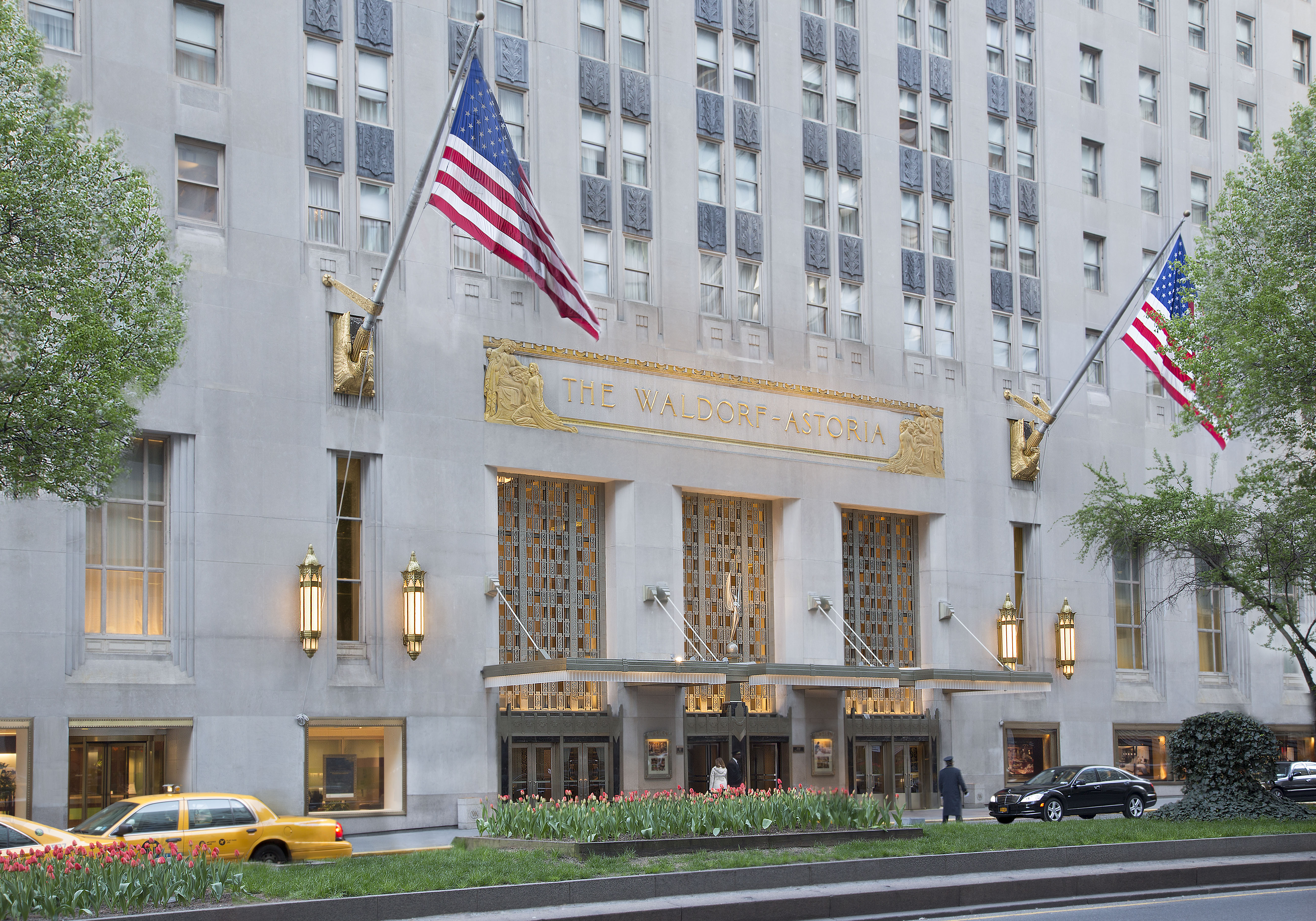
Waldorf-Astoria Park Avenue Entrance

5th Ave. Traffic showing signal tower, New York, from the era Hoover lived downtown

Hoover held the distinction of having the longest duration post-presidency until he was surpassed by Jimmy Carter. During most of this time Hoover resided in the famed New York Waldorf Astoria. It was here that Hoover penned many of his books including his memoirs. He would often be seen on fair weather days taking a stroll around the area, into the nature park, and mingling freely with passerbys.

Hoover was extremely unpopular when he left office in 1933 and remained unpopular for the next several decades. In the 1930s, numerous popular diatribes appeared that were extremely harsh on Hoover; syndicated columnist Arthur Krock in 1931 said Hoover was a failure across the board as a party leader, economist, business authority, and personality. Historian Allan Nevins in July 1932 wrote that Hoover was an "exponent of narrow nationalism." He "botched the tariff, he botched farm relief, he botched prohibition—because he showed a Bourbon temper and an inelastic mind." Textbooks written in the older Progressive tradition identified Hoover with the reactionary side of class conflict. Arthur M. Schlesinger, Jr., a leading progressive exponent, strongly criticized Hoover in his influential work, The Crisis of the Old Order (1957). By the 1950s, however, a new school of consensus historians was replacing the Progressive approach, focusing on values shared across the political spectrum rather than class conflict. They started to praise Hoover for reforms that were picked up and further developed by Franklin Roosevelt's New Deal, such as relief of the unemployed, the Good Neighbor Policy in Latin America, and the Reconstruction Finance Corporation.

Hoover's reputation experienced a strong recovery after 1970. Revisionist scholars in the 1970s portrayed Hoover in terms of the activist Secretary of Commerce that was so attractive to voters in the 1920s, while recognizing some failings in the Depression years. Carl Degler showed that Hoover and FDR were similar in many ways: both were Wilsonians who were shaped by their First World War experiences, gave government a major role in the economy, and imposed controls on big business. To these historians, Hoover was the link between the 1920s and the New Deal. These revisionist historians depicted Hoover as an individual "deserving of respect and historical study for his roles as a humane reformer, idealistic visionary, and institutional developer." Hawley in 2019 concluded that most revisionist historians "continued to agree that Hoover had not been the hardhearted reactionary, financial charlatan, and do-nothing president depicted in the earlier derogatory portrait."

Hoover has been the subject of numerous serious biographies in recent years. Only a few of them, such as William Leuchtenburg's Herbert Hoover (2009), reflect the old negative viewpoint of an unattractive character who was cold and overbearing with little to show for his reforms. By contrast, Glen Jeansonne's Herbert Hoover: A Life (2016) emphasizes Hoover's remarkable combination of advanced technical knowledge, innovative organizing ability, highly profitable business acumen, and compassion for the civilian victims of the Great War. Jeansonne gives Hoover an "A" for effort in dealing with the Great Depression with all the tools known to the White House and new ones as well, albeit without great success. Hoover's reputation has also been affected by works focusing on his career outside of the presidency; biographers such as George H. Nash have shed light on Hoover's career before 1921, while Gary Best wrote a work focused on Hoover's post-presidential career and his influence on the conservative movement.

According to David E. Hamilton, historians have credited Hoover for his genuine belief in voluntarism and cooperation, as well as the innovation of some of his programs. However, Hamilton also notes that Hoover was politically inept and failed to recognize the severity of the Great Depression. Polls of historians and political scientists have generally ranked Hoover in the bottom third of presidents. A 2018 poll of the American Political Science Association’s Presidents and Executive Politics section ranked Hoover as the 36th best president. A 2021 C-SPAN poll of historians also ranked Hoover as the 36th most effective president.
