= 1909 New York City mayoral election =

- November 1909
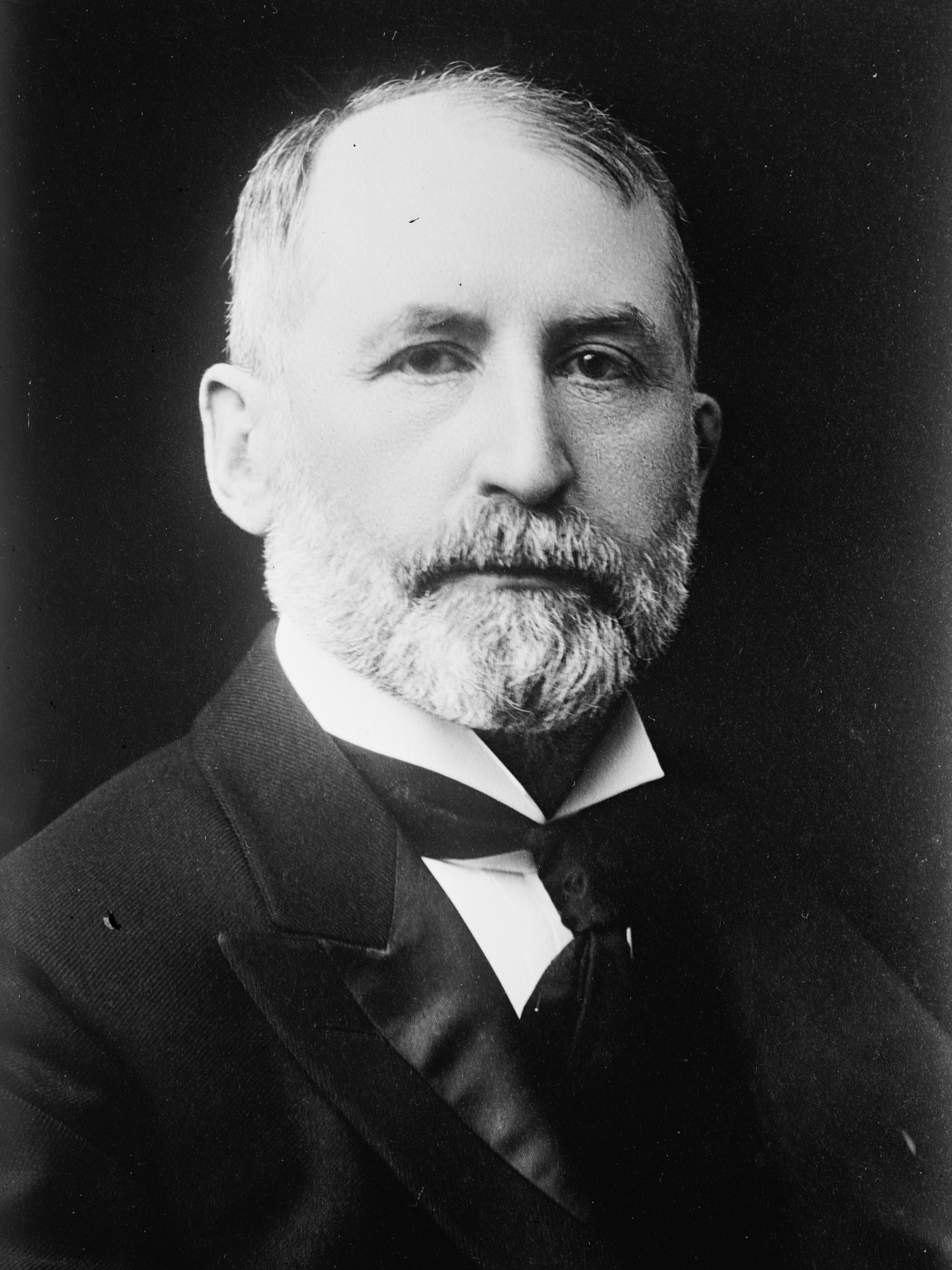

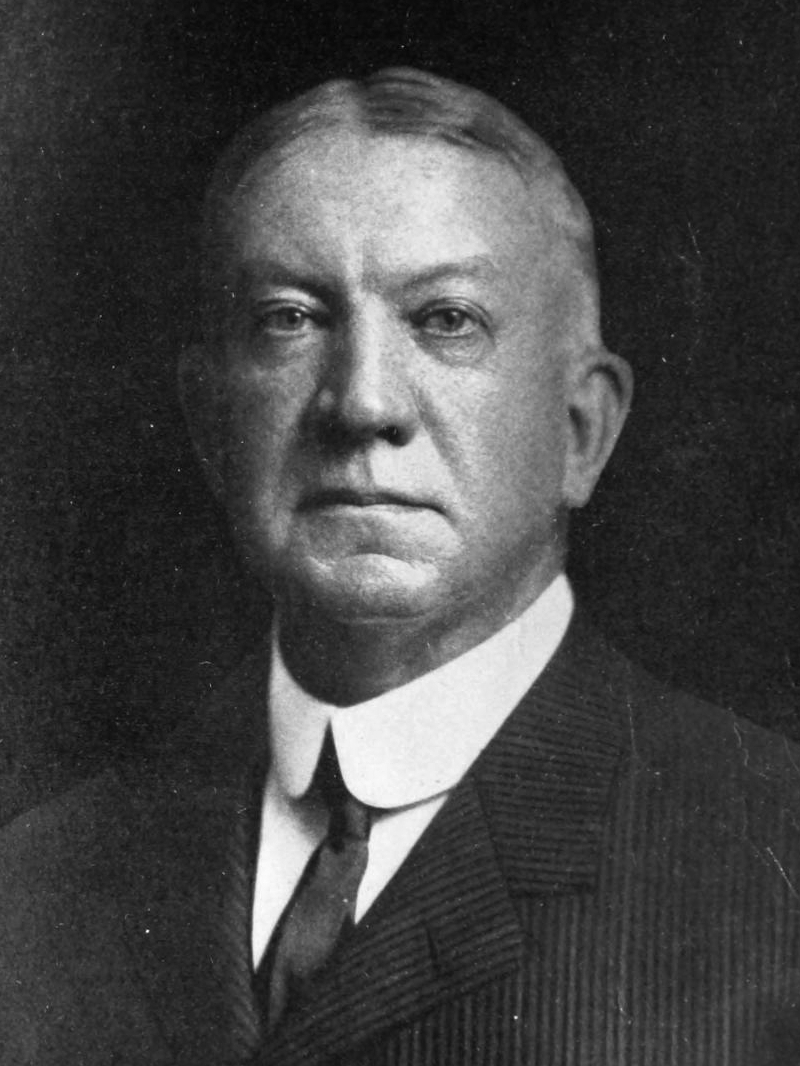

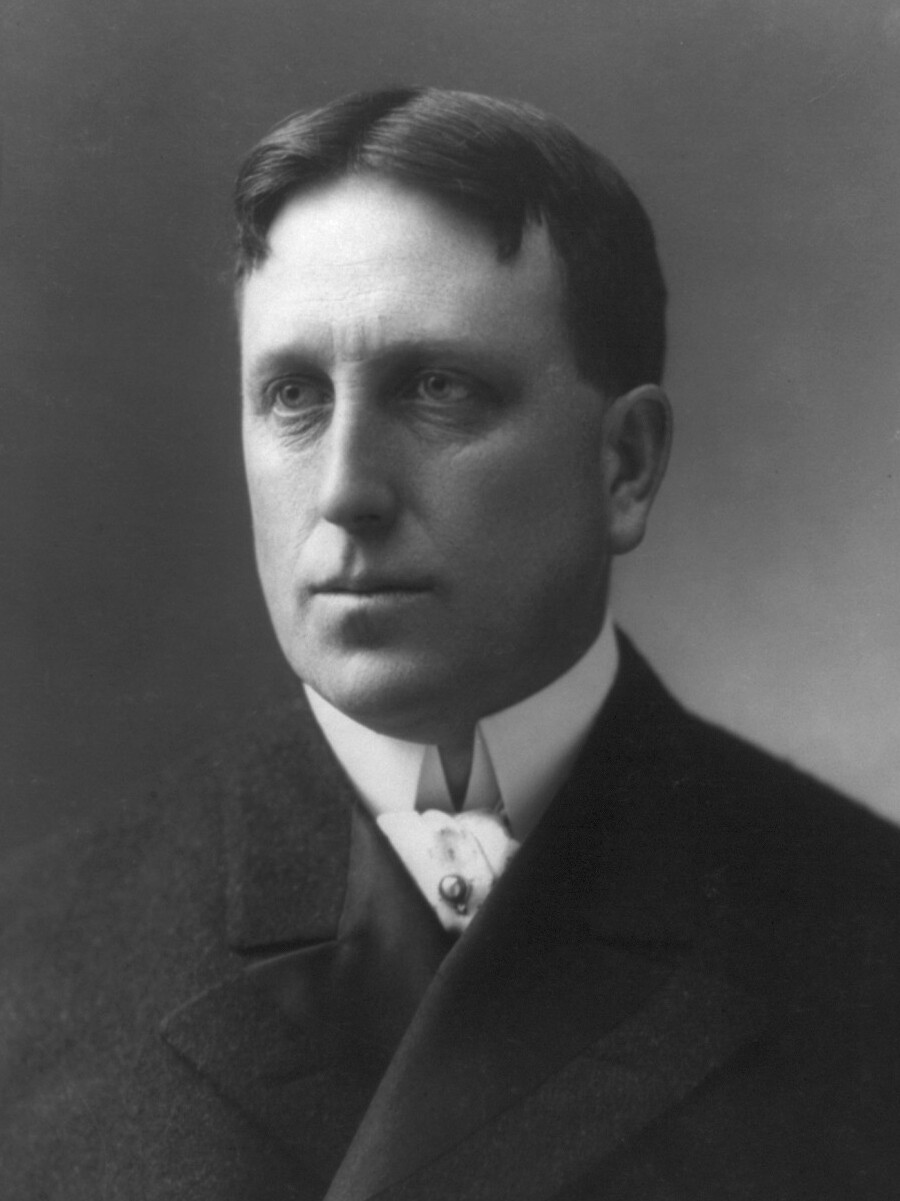
Nominee	William Jay Gaynor	Otto Bannard	William Randolph Hearst
Party	Democratic	Republican	Civic Alliance
Alliance		Fusion
Popular vote	250,378	177,313	154,187
Percentage	42.1%	29.8%	25.9%
- Borough results Gaynor: 30–40% 40–50%
Mayor before election
George B. McClellan Jr.
Democratic
Elected mayor
William Jay Gaynor
Democratic

An election for Mayor of New York City was held in November 1909.

Incumbent mayor George B. McClellan Jr. was not nominated for a third term in office. He was succeeded by Democratic candidate William Jay Gaynor, who defeated William Randolph Hearst and Otto Bannard in the general election.

After the election, Gaynor survived being shot in the throat by a disappointed office-seeker in 1910 but died at sea from the indirect effects of his injury on September 10, 1913. He was succeeded for the rest of 1913 by Ardolph Loges Kline, the acting president of the board of aldermen.

This was the first mayoral election since consolidation that a candidate carried all five boroughs.

== General election ==
=== Candidates ===
- Otto Bannard, president of the New York Trust Company (Republican-Fusion)
- Joseph Cassidy (Socialist)
- William Jay Gaynor, New York State Supreme Court appellate judge (Democratic)
- William Randolph Hearst, publisher of the New York Tribune and former U.S. representative (Civic Alliance)
- James T. Hunter, silversmith and candidate for mayor in 1903 (Socialist Labor)

=== Results ===
1909 New York City mayoral election
Party	Candidate	Votes	%
Democratic	William Jay Gaynor	250,378	42.1%
Republican	Otto T. Bannard	177,313	29.8%
Civic Alliance	William Randolph Hearst	154,187	25.9%
Socialist	Joseph Cassidy	11,768	2.0%
Socialist Labor	John Kinneally	1,256	0.2%
Total votes		604,673	100.00
Democratic hold			

==== Results by borough ====
1909	Party	The Bronx and Manhattan	Brooklyn	Queens	Richmond [Staten Is.]	Total	%
William Jay Gaynor	Democratic	134,075	91,666	17,570	7,067	250,378	42.1%
William Jay Gaynor	Democratic	42.5%	41.9%	38.4%	47.1%	250,378	42.1%
Otto T. Bannard	Republican - Fusion	86,497	73,860	11,907	5,049	177,313	29.8%
Otto T. Bannard	Republican - Fusion	27.4%	33.8%	26.0%	33.6%	177,313	29.8%
William Randolph Hearst	Civic Alliance	87,155	49,040	15,186	2,806	154,187	25.9%
William Randolph Hearst	Civic Alliance	27.6%	22.4%	33.2%	18.7%	154,187	25.9%
Joseph Cassidy	Socialist	6,811	3,874	1,004	79	11,768	2.0%
James T. Hunter	Socialist Labor	813	369	56	18	1,256	0.2%
TOTAL		315,351	218,809	45,723	15,019	594,902	
