= National Credit Corporation =

The National Credit Corporation was an independent agency of the United States federal government established in 1931 to stem the tide of bank failures across the US. The corporation served as an intermediary in the interbank lending market, loaning funds from its $500,000,000 banker's pool to banks on the verge of failure. While the corporation was successful in restoring the liquidity of banks on the verge of failure, factors such as the high rates of deflation and unemployment meant that the solvency of banks alone would be insufficient to restore public confidence in the economy.

In 1932 the corporation was replaced with the Reconstruction Finance Corporation, a federal lender of last resort with the broader scope of supporting state and local governments and making loans to banks, railroads, mortgage associations, and other businesses.

== History ==
Following the quadrupling of yearly bank failures from 600 in 1929 to 2,293 in 1931, the National Credit Corporation was established by the Hoover administration as an intermediary in the interbank lending market to provide loans to banks on the brink of failure. Having convinced large surviving banks to loan money to failing banks as a solution to bank runs, the corporation had access to a $500,000,000 banker's pool to finance loans to failing banks. The president of the Corporation was Mortimer N. Buckner, the chairman of the New York Trust Company and president of the New York Clearing House.

Loans were supposed to be ready in October 1931, which lead to an increase in the "tone of confidence."

In November 1931, the New York State Banking Department approved a merger between the Bank of America Safe Deposit Company into the National City Safe Deposit Company under the latter's name with an authorization certificate from the Corporation for $2,000,000 capital.

By December 1931, President Buckner stated that the Corporation was "functioning in every one of the twelve Federal Reserve Districts" and had granted all loans asked by banks. All "needed funds had been supplied by loans to the corporation on the part of the large New York City banks without the necessity of issuing a call for payment by member banks of part of their subscriptions to the corporation's gold notes."

On January 14, 1932, however, Buckner "issued a call for payment of a second installment of 10 per cent of subscriptions to the gold notes of the corporation." The $50,000,000 call, brought the total payments made to about $100,000,000, or one-fifth of the corporation's subscribed funds. Later that same month, the Corporation issued another call for payment of the third installment of 10 per cent, or approximately $50,000,000, on subscriptions to its gold notes payable at the Federal Reserve Bank in each district. At the same time as the third call, it was noted that after "the Reconstruction Finance Corporation begins functioning, it is understood it will take over the activities of the National Credit Corporation. When the latter was formed, it was the consensus that it would be dissolved as soon as possible after legislation had been enacted to permit the Federal Government to render such services."

By the end of March 1932, the Corporation had paid off $20,250,000, or roughly 15 percent of notes. By mid-April 1932, the Corporation announced a third repayment of part of the funds subscribed to it by banks throughout the country, leaving $79,775,000 of its notes outstanding.

== Analysis ==
The National Credit Corporation was designed to provide funds to sound banks against sound assets that were not legally eligible for rediscount at the Federal Reserve Banks.

== See also ==
- Reconstruction Finance Corporation
