= Emergency Relief and Construction Act =

- Other short titles: Destitution Relief Act of 1932; Economic Rehabilitation Act of 1932; Emergency Highway Construction Act of 1932
- Long title: An Act to relieve destitution, to broaden the lending powers of the Reconstruction Finance Corporation, and to create employment by providing for and expediting a public-works program.
- Nicknames: Emergency Relief and Construction Act of 1932
- Enacted by: the 72nd United States Congress
- Effective: July 21, 1932

Citations
- Public law: 72-302
- Statutes at Large: 47 Stat. 709

Codification
- Titles amended: 12 U.S.C.: Banks and Banking; 15 U.S.C.: Commerce and Trade; 23 U.S.C.: Highways; 31 U.S.C.: Money and Finance

Legislative history
- Introduced in the House as H.R. 9642 by Edward B. Almon (D-AL) on February 25, 1932; Committee consideration by House Rules; Passed the House on February 27, 1932 (205-109); Passed the Senate on July 13, 1932 (60-10); Reported by the joint conference committee on July 15, 1932; agreed to by the House on July 15, 1932 (286-48) and by the Senate on July 16, 1932 (Agreed); Signed into law by President Herbert Hoover on July 21, 1932

The Emergency Relief and Construction Act (ch. 520, 47 Stat. 709, enacted July 21, 1932), was the United States's first major-relief legislation, enabled under Herbert Hoover and later adopted and expanded by Franklin D. Roosevelt as part of his New Deal.

The Emergency Relief and Construction Act was an amendment to the Reconstruction Finance Corporation Act which was signed on January 22, 1932. It created the Reconstruction Finance Corporation which released funds for public works projects across the country. The Brooklyn Navy Yard received an allotment of $880,000, marked for specific projects such as $215,000 for repairs and the maintenance of roofs, waterfront quays and docks, and Yard's railroad system. The biggest chunk, $855,000, was designated for a major overhaul of the power plant, to put in a new turbo generator, piping, boilers, and other engines. The Act was designed to be a temporary means of providing employment and all the positions created in the navy yard to service the projects were therefore classified as temporary. In another preview of New Deal spending, the government even authorized the Act funds to start building a number of destroyers in the navy yards.

According to the Department of Housing and Urban Development, "This was the government’s first major involvement in the housing field. The RFC was authorized to make loans to private corporations providing housing for low-income families. Also in 1932, the Federal Home Loan Bank Board was established to make advances on the security of home mortgages and establish a Home Loan Bank System."
