= John Bannard =

Augustinian friar at Oxford (fl. 1412)

John Bannard (fl. 1412), was an Augustinian friar at Oxford.

Bannard is mentioned in Anthony à Wood's account of the Oxford members of this fraternity. According to Wood he flourished about 1412, and is stated to have been professor of theology, and afterwards chancellor of the university. Wood professes to have collected the materials for his short notice of Bannard from some manuscript fragments extant in his time in the library of Corpus Christi College, Oxford, which formerly belonged to the library of Exeter Cathedral. Tanner adds that in the same college library (MS. cxvi.) there is a treatise directed against the views entertained by John Bannard, the Augustinian, on the question of the Immaculate Conception; but no mention of this author is to be found in Mr. Coxe's catalogue of the Oxford college manuscripts. According to Wood, Bannard's chief work was entitled ‘Eruditæ Quæstiones in Magistrum Sententiarum;’ and he adds that this production created such a stir as to call forth a refutation at the hands of other Oxford divines of the age.
