= Reconstruction Finance Corporation =

Former American independent agency

Independent agency of the United States government overview
- Formed: 1931
- Dissolved: 1957
- Type: Lender of last resort during the Great Depression in the United States
- Headquarters: Washington, DC, United States of America

Reconstruction Finance Corporation Act
- Long title: An Act To provide emergency financing facilities for financial institutions, to aid in financing agriculture, commerce, and industry, and for other purposes
- Acronyms (colloquial): RFC Act
- Enacted by: the 72nd United States Congress

Citations
- Public law: Pub. L. 72–2
- Statutes at Large: 47 Stat. 5

Codification
- Titles amended: 15

Legislative history
- Introduced in the House as H.R. 7360 by James W. Collier; Committee consideration by House Banking and Currency; Passed the House on; Passed the Senate on; Signed into law by President Herbert Hoover on January 22, 1932

Major amendments
- Emergency Relief and Construction Act of 1932

The Reconstruction Finance Corporation (RFC) was an independent agency of the United States federal government that served as a lender of last resort to US banks and businesses. Established in 1932 by the Hoover administration to restore public confidence in the economy and banking to their pre-Depression levels, the RFC provided financial support to state and local governments, recapitalized banks to prevent bank failures and stimulate lending, and made loans to railroads, mortgage associations, and other large businesses.

The Roosevelt administration's New Deal reforms expanded the agency, enabling it to direct disaster relief funds and provide loans for agriculture, exports, and housing. The RFC closed in 1957 when prosperity had been restored and for-profit private financial institutions could handle its mission. In total, the RFC gave US$2 billion in aid to state and local governments and made many loans, nearly all of which were repaid.

== History ==
In 1931, amidst the high rates of bank failure, deflation, and unemployment that characterized the Great Depression in the United States, Federal Reserve board member Eugene Meyer proposed the establishment of a government agency empowered to make loans to banks and businesses in critical sectors of the US economy. Modeled after the War Finance Corporation, a government corporation that financially supported industries critical to the war effort during World War I, its purpose would be to stimulate economic growth in the United States and restore public confidence in banking and the economy. It would replace the National Credit Corporation, an agency created in 1931 to restore the liquidity of banks on the brink of failure with loans funded by the interbank lending market.

On January 22, 1932, the Reconstruction Finance Corporation Act was signed into law by President Herbert Hoover after being passed by Congress with broad bipartisan support. The Reconstruction Finance Corporation (RFC) began its operations on February 2, 1932. Like the Federal Reserve, the RFC would loan to banks, but it was designed to serve state-chartered banks and small banks in rural areas that were not part of the Federal Reserve System. Another distinction was that the RFC could make loans on the basis of collateral that the Federal Reserve and other lenders would not accept. The related Banking Act of 1932, signed on February 27, broadened the Federal Reserve's lending powers, and gave it the power to make national policy to mitigate the problems with the economy. Eugene Meyer, who had pushed for both pieces of legislation, after heading up an organization similar to the RFC during World War I, was a governor of the Federal Reserve, and chairman of the Board of the RFC. Essentially, the RFC was the "discount lending" arm of the Federal Reserve.

The initial funding for the RFC came from the sale of US$500 million worth of stocks and bonds to the United States Treasury. To obtain more capital, it sold US$1.5 billion in bonds to the Treasury, which then sold them to the general public. In its first couple of years, the RFC needed a loan of US$51.3 billion from the Treasury and US$3.1 billion from the public.

The RFC lent to solvent institutions that could not be sold to repay their existing liabilities but would be able to do so in the long run. A main reason for such loans was to ensure that depositors got their money back. The Reconstruction Finance Corporation spent US$1.5 billion in 1932, US$1.8 billion in 1933, and US$1.8 billion in 1934 before dropping to about US$350 million a year. In August 1939, on the eve of World War II, it greatly expanded to build munitions factories. In 1941, it disbursed US$1.8 billion. The total loaned or otherwise disbursed by the RFC from 1932 through 1941 was US$9.465 billion.

Chairmen of the Board of Directors

Name	Dates of service
Eugene Meyer	February 2, 1932 – July 31, 1932
Atlee Pomerene	August 1, 1932 – March 4, 1933
Jesse H. Jones	May 5, 1933 – July 15, 1939
Emil Schram	July 16, 1939 – June 29, 1941
Charles B. Henderson	June 30, 1941 – April 9, 1947
John D. Goodloe	April 9, 1947 – April 30, 1948
Harley Hise	August 5, 1948 – October 9, 1950
W. Elmer Harber	October 11, 1950 – May 4, 1951

Administrators and Deputy Administrators

Name and position	Dates of service
W. Stuart Symington, Administrator	May 4, 1951 – February 15, 1952
Peter I. Bukowski, Deputy Administrator	June 20, 1951 – December 31, 1951
Leo Nielson, Acting Administrator	February 15, 1952 – February 26, 1952
Harry A. McDonald, Administrator	February 26, 1952 – May 1, 1953
Clarence A. Beutel, Deputy Administrator	September 10, 1952 – June 1, 1953
Kenton R. Cravens, Administrator	May 1, 1953 – March 31, 1954
Laurence B. Robbins, Deputy Administrator	December 10, 1953 – March 31, 1954
Laurence B. Robbins, Acting Administrator	March 31, 1954 – April 26, 1954
Laurence B. Robbins, Administrator	April 26, 1954 – June 30, 1954

== Under President Herbert Hoover ==
The first RFC president was the former US Vice President Charles Dawes. He soon resigned to attend to his bank in Chicago, which was in danger of failing, and President Herbert Hoover appointed Atlee Pomerene of Ohio to head the agency in July 1932. The presidency of the RFC thus switched from a Republican to a Democrat. Hoover's reasons for reorganizing the RFC included: the broken health and resignations of Eugene Meyer, Paul Bestor, and Charles Dawes; the failure of banks to perform their duties to their clientele or to aid American industry; the country's general lack of confidence in the current board; and Hoover's inability to find any other man who had the ability and was both nationally respected and available.

Like the Federal Reserve, the RFC tended to bail out the banks that benefited the public the most. Butkiewicz (1995) shows that the RFC initially succeeded in reducing bank failures, but the publication of the names of loan recipients beginning in August 1932 (at the demand of Congress) significantly reduced its effectiveness, because it appeared that political considerations had motivated certain loans. Partisan politics hindered the RFC's efforts, though in 1932, monetary conditions improved because the RFC slowed the decline in the nation's money supply.

The original legislation establishing the RFC did not limit it to lending to financial institutions; it was also authorized to provide loans for railroad construction and crop lands. An amendment passed in July 1932 allowed the RFC to provide loans to state and municipal governments. The purpose of these loans was to finance projects like dams and bridges, and the money would be repaid by charging fees to use these structures. To help with unemployment, a relief program was created that would be repaid by tax receipts.

== Under President Franklin D. Roosevelt ==
The Presidency of Franklin D. Roosevelt increased the RFC's funding, streamlined the bureaucracy, and used it to help restore business prosperity, especially in banking and railroads. Roosevelt appointed Texas banker Jesse H. Jones to lead the agency, and Jones turned the RFC into an empire with loans made in every state.

Under the New Deal, the powers of the RFC were greatly expanded. The agency now purchased bank stock and extended loans for agriculture, housing, exports, businesses, governments, and disaster relief. Roosevelt soon directed the RFC to buy gold to change its market price. The original legislation did not call for identities of the banks receiving loans nor of any reports to Congress. This, however, was changed in July 1932 to make the RFC transparent. Bankers soon were hesitant to ask the RFC for a loan since depositers would become aware and begin to consider the possibility of their bank failing causing them to withdraw their deposits, a practice called bank running.

The RFC also had a division that gave the states loans for emergency relief needs. In a case study of Mississippi, Vogt (1985) examined two areas of RFC funding: aid to banking, which helped many Mississippi banks survive the economic crisis, and work relief, which Roosevelt used to pump money into the state's relief program by extending loans to businesses and local government projects. Although charges of political influence and racial discrimination were levied against RFC activities, the agency made positive contributions and established a federal agency in local communities which provided a reservoir of experienced personnel to implement expanding New Deal programs.

Roosevelt saw this corporation as an advantage to the national government. The RFC could finance projects without Congress approving them and the loans would not be included in budget expenditures. Soon the RFC was able to buy bank preferred stock with the Emergency Banking Act of 1933. Buying stock would serve as collateral when banks needed loans. This, however, was somewhat controversial because if the RFC was a shareholder, then it could interfere with salaries and bank management. The Federal Deposit Insurance Corporation (FDIC) was later created to help decrease bank failures and insure bank deposits. The second main assistance was to farmers and their crop lands. The Commodity Credit Corporation was established to provide assistance. The agriculture was hit hard with a drought and machinery like the tractor. One benefit it provided to these rural cities was the Electric Home and Farm Authority, which provided electricity and gas and assistance in buying appliances to use these services.

The mortgage company was affected as well since families were not able to make their payments. This led the RFC to create its own mortgage company to sell and insure mortgages. The Federal National Mortgage Association (also known as Fannie Mae) was established and funded by the RFC. It later became a private corporation. An Export–Import Bank was also created to encourage trade with the Soviet Union. Another bank was established to fund trade with all other foreign nations a month later. They eventually merged and make loans available to exports. Roosevelt wanted to reduce the gold value of the US dollar. In order to accomplish this, the RFC purchased large amounts of gold until a price floor was set.

== World War II ==
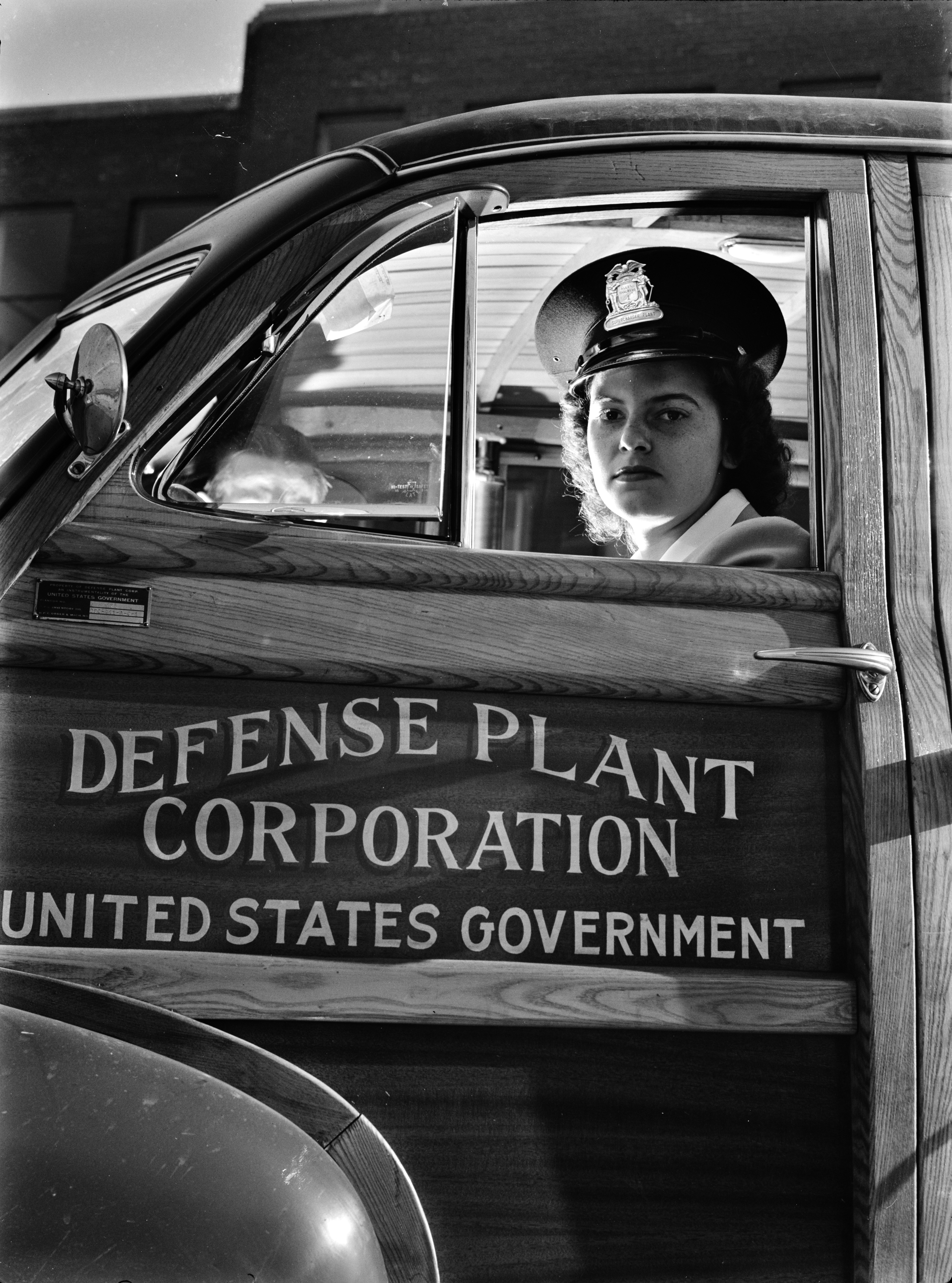
A shuttle driver at the Allis-Chalmers Supercharger plant in Milwaukee (October 1942)

The RFC's powers, which had grown even before World War II began, further expanded during the war. President Roosevelt merged the RFC and the Federal Deposit Insurance Corporation (FDIC), which was one of the landmarks of the New Deal. Oscar Cox, a primary author of the Lend-Lease Act and general counsel of the Foreign Economic Administration, joined as well. Lauchlin Currie, formerly of the Federal Reserve Board staff, was the deputy administrator to Leo Crowley. The RFC established eight new corporations and purchased an existing corporation. Its eight wartime subsidiaries were the Metals Reserve Company, Rubber Reserve Company, Defense Plant Corporation, Defense Supplies Corporation, War Damage Corporation, US Commercial Company, Rubber Development Corporation, and Petroleum Reserve Corporation. These corporations helped fund the development of synthetic rubber, the construction and operation of a tin smelter, and the establishment of abaca (Manila hemp) plantations in Central America. Both natural rubber and abaca (used to produce rope products) had been produced primarily in South Asia, which came under Japanese control during the war. The RFC's programs encouraged the development of alternative sources of these materials. Synthetic rubber, which was not produced in the United States prior to the war, quickly became the primary source of rubber in the postwar years.

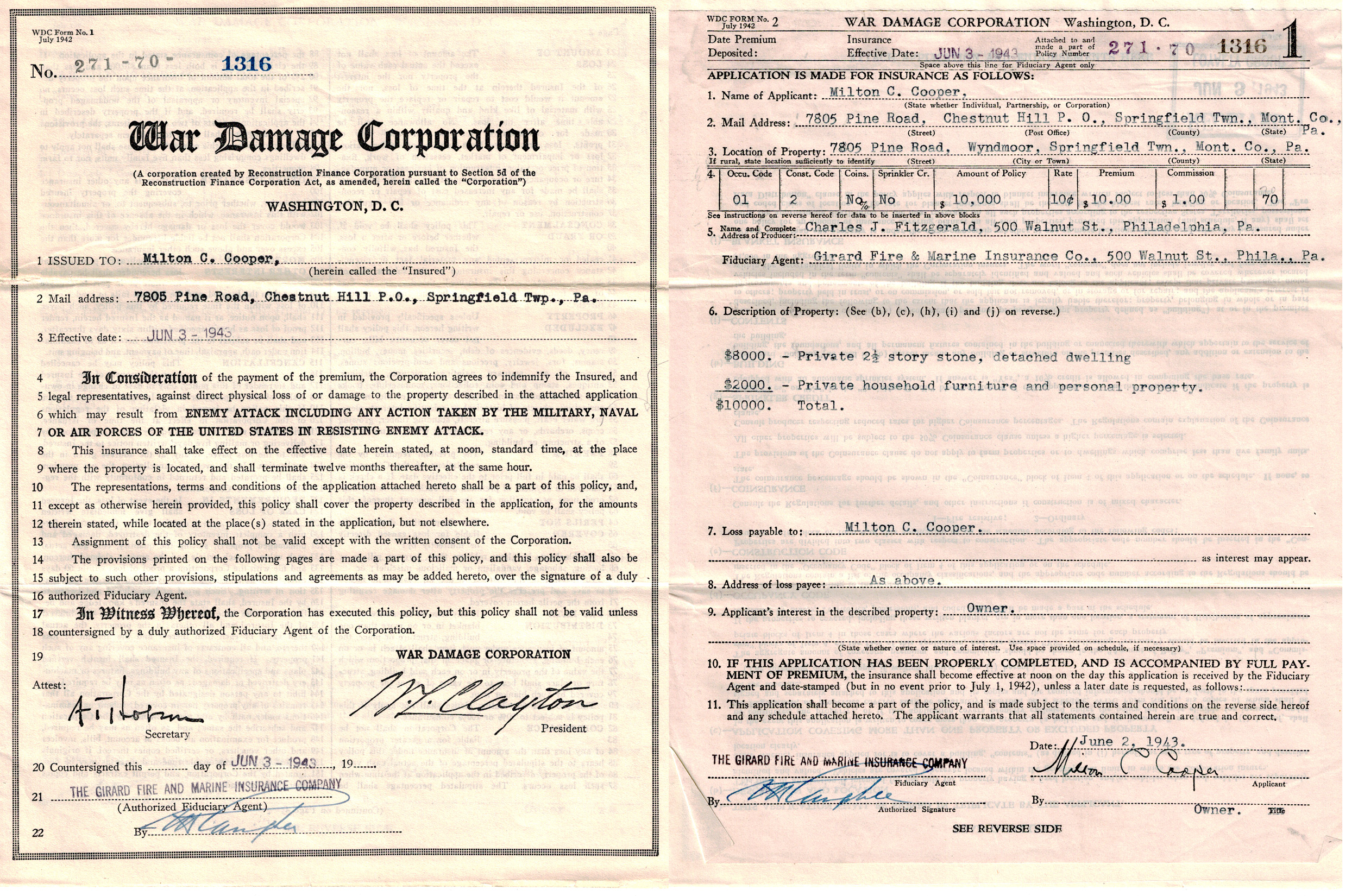
An insurance policy issued by the War Damage Corporation in 1943

The War Insurance Corporation was established December 13, 1941 by Act of June 10, 1941 (55 Stat. 249), was renamed the War Damage Corporation by Act of March 27, 1942 (56 Stat. 175), and its charter filed March 31, 1942. It had been created by the Federal Loan Administrator with the approval of the President of the United States pursuant to §5(d) of the Reconstruction Finance Corporation Act or 1932, 15 USCA §606(b) for the purpose of providing insurance covering damage to property of American nationals not otherwise available from private insurers arising from "enemy attack including by the military, naval of air forces of the United States in resisting enemy attack". Prior to July 1, 1942, the War Damage Corporation provided for such insurance without compensation, but by express Congressional enactment Congress added §5(g) to the Reconstruction Finance Corporation Act, 15 USCA §606(b)(2) requiring that on and after July 1, 1942, the War Damage Corporation should issue insurance policies upon the payment of annual premiums. Under the terms of War Damage Corporation's charter an authorized capital stock of US$100,000,000 was provided, all of which was subscribed for by the Reconstruction Finance Corporation.

The corporation was transferred from the Federal Loan Agency to the Department of Commerce by Executive Order #9071 of February 24, 1942, returned to the Federal Loan Agency by Act of February 24, 1945 (59 Stat. 5), and abolished by Act of June 30, 1947 (61 Stat. 202) with its functions assumed by Reconstruction Finance Corporation. The powers of War Damage Corporation, except for purposes of liquidation, terminated as of January 22, 1947.

From 1941 through 1945, the RFC authorized over US$2 billion of loans and investments each year, with a peak of over US$6 billion authorized in 1943. The magnitude of RFC lending had increased substantially during the war.

The Petroleum Reserves Corporation was transferred to the Office of Economic Warfare, which was consolidated into the Foreign Economic Administration, which was transferred to the Reconstruction Finance Corporation and changed to the War Assets Corporation. The War Assets Corporation was dissolved after March 25, 1946. Most lending to wartime subsidiaries ended in 1945, and all such lending ended in 1948.

=== World War II aircraft disposal ===
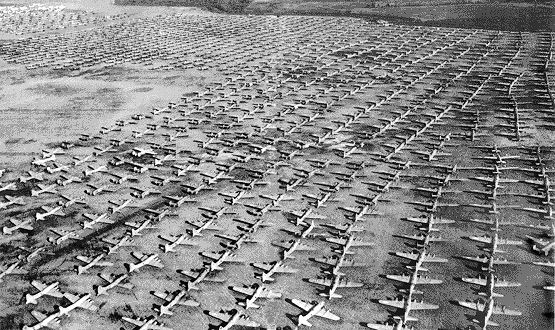
Acres of World War II aircraft in storage, awaiting their fate at Kingman, 1946

After the war, the Reconstruction Finance Corporation established five large storage, sales, and scrapping centers for Army Air Forces aircraft at the Albuquerque AAF, New Mexico; Altus AAF, Oklahoma; Kingman AAF, Arizona; Ontario Army Air Field, California; and Walnut Ridge AAF, Arkansas.

Estimates of the number of surplus airplanes ran as high as 150,000. By the summer of 1945, at least 30 sales-storage depots and 23 sales centers were in operation. In November 1945, it was estimated that a total of 117,210 aircraft would be transferred as surplus. Many thousands ended up sold or gifted by the US military to the air forces of friendly allies around the globe.

Between 1945 and June 1947, the RFC, the War Assets Corporation, and the War Assets Administration (the disposal function of the RFC was transferred to WAC on January 15, 1946, and to the WAA in March 1946) processed approximately 61,600 remaining World War II aircraft, Some 34,700 “utility“ type were sold for primarily commercial purposes, and 26,900 primarily combat types auctioned for scrapping.

Most of the transports and trainers could be used in the civil fleet, with trainers disposed of for US$875 to US$2,400. The fighters and bombers were of little peacetime value, with a smattering being sold for conversions to useful civilian purposes like aerial firefighting (a mere handful survived such second careers to be preserved as warbirds preservation and exhibits in aviation museums).

== Disbanding ==
After World War II ended, the type of loans provided by the RFC were no longer in demand. In the late 1940s, the RFC made a large loan to Northwest Orient Airlines earmarked for the purchase of ten Boeing Stratocruiser airliners. The loan became controversial, seen as a political favor to the Boeing Corporation, who supported the re-election campaign of President Harry S. Truman, and sparked a congressional inquiry. President Dwight D. Eisenhower was in office when legislation terminated the RFC. It was "abolished as an independent agency by act of Congress (1953) and was transferred to the Department of the Treasury to wind up its affairs, effective June 1954. It was totally disbanded in 1957." The Small Business Administration was established to provide loans to small business, and training programs were created. Several federal agencies took over RFC assets, and the tin and abaca programs were handled by General Services Administration. The Commodity Credit Corporation, which was created to help farmers, remained in operation. Another establishment kept in operation is the Export–Import Bank, which encourages exports.

In 1991, Rep. Jamie L. Whitten (Democrat of Mississippi) introduced a bill to reestablish the RFC, but it did not receive a hearing by a congressional committee, and he did not reintroduce the bill in subsequent sessions.

== See also ==
- Resolution Trust Corporation
- Federal Emergency Management Agency
- Emergency Relief and Construction Act

== Bibliography ==
- Barber, William J. (1985). From New Era to New Deal: Herbert Hoover, the Economists, and American Economic Policy, 1921–1933. Cambridge: Cambridge University Press. ISBN 9780521305266.
- Butkiewicz, James L. (April 1995). "The Impact of a Lender of Last Resort During the Great Depression: the Case of the Reconstruction Finance Corporation". Explorations in Economic History. 32 (2): 197–216. doi:10.1006/exeh.1995.1007. ISSN 0014-4983.
- Butkiewicz, James (July 19, 2002). "Reconstruction Finance Corporation". In Whaples, Robert (ed.). EH.Net Encyclopedia. Archived from the original on October 29, 2013.
- Butkiewicz, James. "Eugene Meyer and the German Influence on the Origin of US Federal Financial Rescues." Journal of the History of Economic Thought 37.1 (2015): 57–77. online
- Calomiris, Charles W., et al. "The effects of reconstruction finance corporation assistance on Michigan's banks' survival in the 1930s." Explorations in Economic History 50.4 (2013): 526–547. online
- Calomiris, Charles W., Marc Flandreau, and Luc Laeven. "Political foundations of the lender of last resort: a global historical narrative." Journal of Financial Intermediation 28 (2016): 48–65. online
- Ebersole, Franklin, J. “One Year of the Reconstruction Finance Corporation.” Quarterly Journal of Economics 47#3 (May 1933): 464–492.
- Gou, Michael et al. "Banking Acts of 1932" 100 Years Federal Reserve System (2013) online
- Jones, Jesse H.; Pforzheimer, Carl H. (1951). Fifty billion dollars: My thirteen years with the RFC, 1932–1945. New York: Macmillan. OCLC 233209. detailed memoir by longtime chairman
- Koistinen, Paul A. C. (2004). Arsenal of World War II: The Political Economy of American Warfare, 1940–1945. Lawrence, KS: University Press of Kansas. ISBN 9780700613083. shows how RFC financed many war plants
- Lawson, Aidan. "US Reconstruction Finance Corporation: Preferred Stock Purchase Program." Journal of Financial Crises 3.3 (2021): 738–785. online
- Mason, Joseph. “Do Lender of Last Resort Policies Matter? The Effects of Reconstruction Finance Corporation Assistance to Banks.” Journal of Financial Services Research 20#1 (September 2001): 77–95.
- Mason, Joseph R. (April 2003). "The Political Economy of Reconstruction Finance Corporation Assistance During the Great Depression". Explorations in Economic History. 40 (2): 101–121. doi:10.1016/S0014-4983(03)00013-5. ISSN 0014-4983.
- Nash, Gerald D. (December 1959). "Herbert Hoover and the Origins of the Reconstruction Finance Corporation". The Mississippi Valley Historical Review. 46 (3): 455–468. doi:10.2307/1892269. ISSN 0161-391X. JSTOR 1892269.
- Olson, James S. (1977). Herbert Hoover and the Reconstruction Finance Corporation, 1931–1933 (1st ed.). Ames, IA: Iowa State University Press. ISBN 9780813808802.
- Olson, James S. (1988). Saving Capitalism: The Reconstruction Finance Corporation and the New Deal, 1933–1940. Princeton, NJ: Princeton University Press. ISBN 9780691047492.
- Shriver, Phillip R. (1982). "A Hoover Vignette". Ohio History. 91: 74–82. ISSN 0030-0934.
- Vogt, Daniel C. (1985). "Hoover's RFC in Action: Mississippi, Bank Loans, and Work Relief, 1932–1933". Journal of Mississippi History. 47 (1): 35–53. ISSN 0022-2771.
- White, Gerald Taylor (1980). Billions for Defense: Government Financing by the Defense Plant Corporation During World War II. University, AL: University of Alabama Press. ISBN 9780817300180.

=== Video ===
- Strange, Eric, prod. (1999). Brother, Can You Spare a Billion? The Story of Jesse H. Jones (Color and black and white video). Houston, TX: Houston Public Television.
