= Otto T. Bannard =

American attorney, businessman and philanthropist

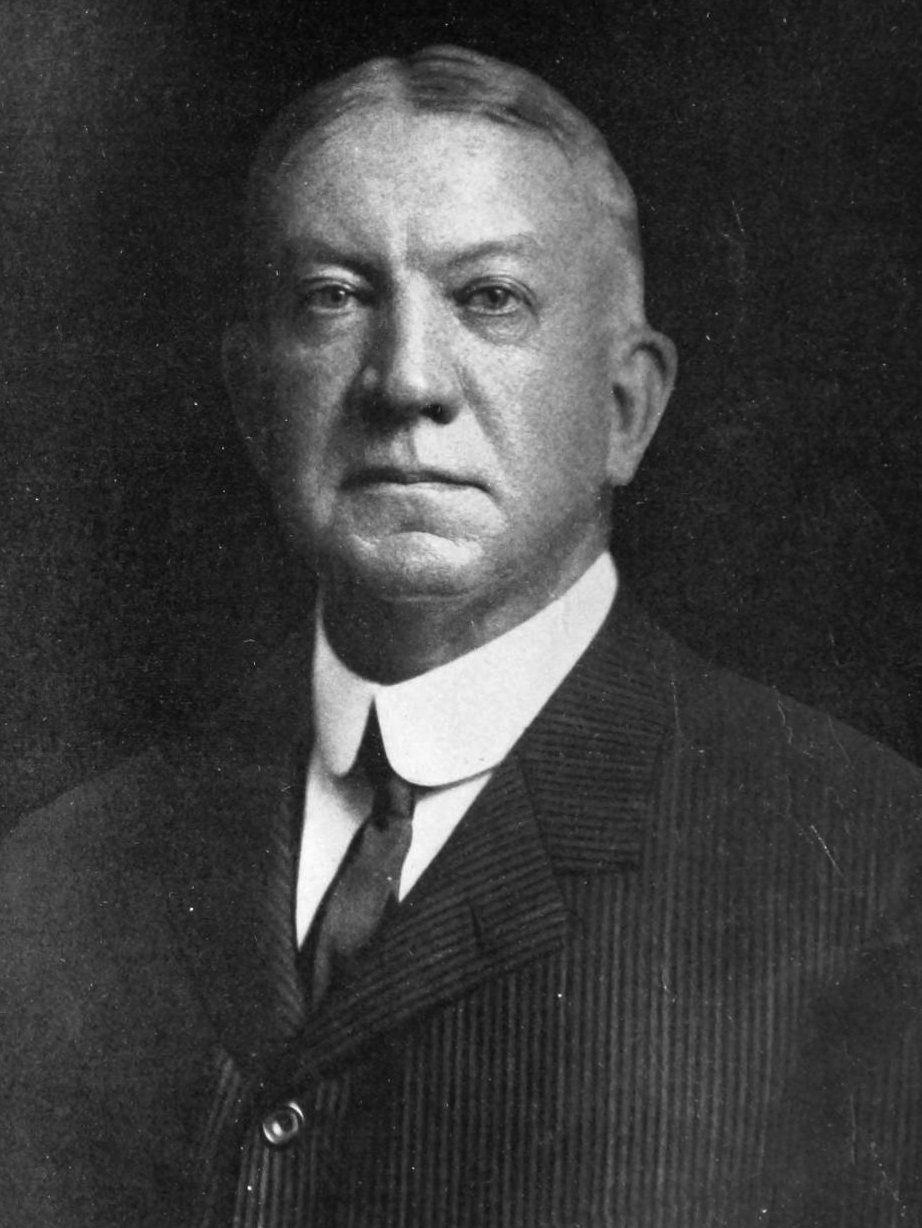
- Bannard in 1910

President of the New York Trust Company
- In office 1904–1915
- Preceded by: Charles S. Fairchild (as president of the New York Security and Trust Company)
- Succeeded by: Mortimer N. Buckner

Personal details
- Born: Otto Tremont Bannard; April 28, 1854 Brooklyn, New York City, U.S.
- Died: January 15, 1929 (aged 74) At sea aboard the SS President Cleveland
- Parent(s): John Winslow Bannard; Eliza Landon Stone
- Education: Beloit College
- Alma mater: Yale University; Columbia Law School
- Occupation: Attorney, businessman

Otto Tremont Bannard (April 28, 1854 – January 15, 1929) was an American attorney, banker, businessman and philanthropist who donated to Yale University, his alma mater. He stood for mayor of New York in 1909 but lost. He died at sea while on a cruise to the Philippines.

== Early life ==
Otto Tremont Bannard was born on April 28, 1854, in Brooklyn, New York. He was the youngest of five children born to John Winslow Bannard (1822–1911) and his wife Eliza Landon Stone (1821–1903). Among his siblings were Henry Clay Bannard, Hubbard Francis Bannard, Walter Clifton Bannard, and Estella Stone Bannard.

His father had emigrated with his parents from Oxfordshire, England and settled in Schenectady, New York. He became a successful New York wholesaler of "narrow fabrics" (i.e., lace, ribbon, and embroidery), but suffered severe financial hardship as a result of the Panic of 1857. He relocated with his family to Quincy, Illinois, on the Mississippi River, which at that time is a significant market town and transportation hub. John purchased a small flour mill there, but ten years later the mill burned, leaving the family nearly penniless. Otto's mother began writing poems, essays, and short stories under the pen name "Lizzie" to supplement the family's income.

Otto studied in the preparatory department of Beloit College before attending Yale University, where he was a member of the senior society Skull and Bones, and from which he was graduated with a B.A. in 1876. He was granted an LL.B. degree from Columbia Law School in 1878.

== Career ==
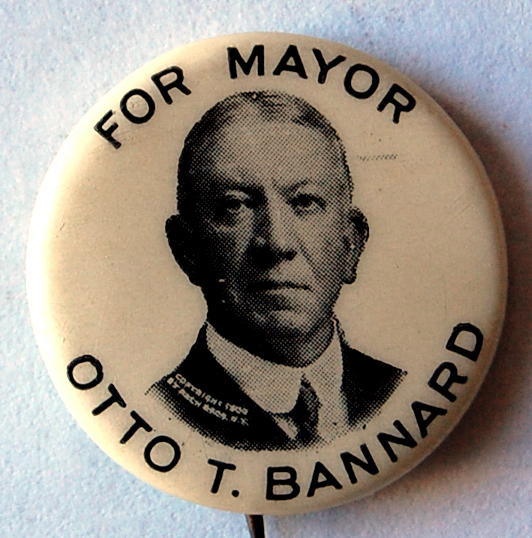
Bannard campaign button

Bannard entered the banking profession, becoming the president of the Continental Trust Company in 1893. In 1904, Continental Trust merged with the New York Security and Trust Company and Bannard became president of the new firm, which took the name of the New York Trust Company in 1905. Charles S. Fairchild, the president of New York Security and Trust (who formerly was the Attorney General of New York and U.S. Secretary of the Treasury) became chairman of New York Trust. Bannard was elected president of the corporation. Bannard served as president until 1915 when he was succeeded by Mortimer N. Buckner (later president of the New York Clearing House). Via a series of mergers, it ultimately became Chemical Bank.

He ran, as a candidate for the mayor of New York City in 1909, in a three-man election that was won by William J. Gaynor. Bannard came in second, with William Randolph Hearst coming in third.

=== Philanthropy ===
In 1927 he was national chairman of a campaign that raised $21,000,000 for the endowment of Yale University. He served as a member of the Yale Corporation for eighteen years.

== Personal life ==
Bannard, who never married, died on January 15, 1929, at sea on the SS President Cleveland en route from Seattle to Manila in the Philippines, a journey he was making for the sake of his health. He is buried in the Grove Street Cemetery in New Haven, Connecticut. His will left a bequest of about $2,000,000 to Yale University, in addition to the numerous gifts he had made during his lifetime.
