= Charles G. Francklyn =

American capitalist and industrialist (1844–1929)

- Born: Charles Gilbert Francklyn; April 18, 1844; Newcastle, England
- Died: January 11, 1929 (aged 84); New York City, New York, U.S.
- Education: Victoria College
- Spouse: Susan Sprague Hoyt (m. 1869)
- Children: 2
- Parent(s): Gilbert Francklyn; Jane Cunard Francklyn
- Relatives: Samuel Cunard (grandfather)

Charles Gilbert Francklyn (April 18, 1844 – January 11, 1929) was an American capitalist and industrialist who was based in New York society during the Gilded Age.

== Early life ==
Francklyn was born near Newcastle in England on April 18, 1844. He was the son of Colonel Gilbert William Francklyn and Sarah Jane (née Cunard) Francklyn (1821–1902).

His maternal grandfather was Samuel Cunard, the Canadian shipping magnate who founded the Cunard Line. His uncle was Sir Edward Cunard, 2nd Baronet, and his first cousin, Sir Bache Cunard, 3rd Baronet lived at Nevill Holt Hall and was married to Maud Cunard. His great-grandfather was pro-slavery apologist Gilbert Francklyn, who owned plantations in Tobago and Jamaica.

Francklyn was educated in Bath, England and at Victoria College in the Island of Jersey.

== Career ==
At the age of 16, he began working for his grandfather's Cunard Line in Halifax, Nova Scotia. After the death of his uncle in 1868, Francklyn became the Line's agent in New York, staying in the role until the agency was incorporated in 1880 and taken over by Vernon H. Brown & Co.

In 1878, he organized the Municipal Gas Light Company, of which he was the first president. In 1884, Francklyn and Harrison E. Gawtry led the merger of six gas companies (including his Municipal Gas Light Company, the New York Gas Light Company, the Manhattan Gas Light Company, and the Metropolitan Gas Light Company) which combined into the Consolidated Gas Company, of which he was a member of the first board of trustees. Consolidated Gas later purchased Thomas Edison's Edison Illuminating Company and became known as the modern day firm of Consolidated Edison. Before his retirement, he would also serve as president of the Central Union Gas Company.

Francklyn also commissioned one of the first residential gas ranges in the United States, built to his specifications for $275 in Baltimore, Maryland.

=== Real estate and mining ===
Francklyn owned mining investments in Utah (including the Horn Silver Mining Company of which he was president), Colorado, San Domingo and the West Indies as well as considerable stock in St. Louis and Pacific Railroad (which later became the Atchison, Topeka and Santa Fe Railway).

In 1882, he purchased 637,440 acres (2,579.6 km^{2}) of railroad lands for $887,000 in Carson County, Texas and adjoining counties to form the Francklyn Land and Cattle Company, not far from Cornelia Adair's JA Ranch. The lands were later sold to the White Deer Lands Trust of British bondholders in 1886 and 1887. By January 1886, a ferocious blizzard, in addition to overspending on livestock, fencing, and living quarters, forced the ranch into bankruptcy.

In 1887, Francklyn was arrested at his home in New York on charges of fraud by his cousin, Sir Bache Cunard, who alleged that Charles had embezzled $3,000,000 that Francklyn was to have invested on behalf of Cunard. The litigation, which lasted for several years (Francklyn was represented by John Notman of Butler, Stillman & Hubbard) resulted in the sale of his Elberon, New Jersey residence and a libel lawsuit by Francklyn to The Times. Eventually in 1889, Cunard withdrew his lawsuit, when the parties reached an agreement, the terms of which were not publicly revealed.

=== Society life ===
In 1892, Francklyn and his wife were included in Ward McAllister's "Four Hundred", purported to be an index of New York's best families, published in The New York Times. Conveniently, 400 was the number of people that could fit into Mrs. Astor's ballroom. He was one of the original members of the Knickerbocker Club (founded in 1871) and was also a member of the Union League Club and a life member of the St. George's Society.

The Francklyns had a twenty-room "cottage" at the Elberon, New Jersey section of Long Branch directly on the ocean, designed by Charles F. McKim of McKim, Mead & White. On September 6 1881, two months after President James Garfield was shot by Charles J. Guiteau in Washington, D.C., the president was taken to Francklyn's cottage, along with his doctors, nurses, and family, to recover. The president died at the cottage shortly thereafter on September 19, 1881. The cottage was later sold in 1889, and eventually burned down on June 14, 1920.

After they sold their New Jersey cottage, they built another summer home in Southampton, New York on Ox Pasture Lane, originally known as Red Croft, in 1897. They had the home for thirty years, helping to make the beach town a fashionable resort among wealthy New Yorkers.

== Personal life ==
In August 1869, Francklyn was married to Susan Sprague Hoyt (1845–1932). Susan was born at 94 Fifth Avenue and was the daughter of Edward Hoyt, the head of Hoyt, Sprague & Co., and Susan (née Sprague) Hoyt. Her father's family was from Stamford, Connecticut and among her many prominent family members was uncle William Sprague IV, the Governor of Rhode Island during the Civil War and great-uncle William Sprague III, a U.S. Representative, U.S. Senator and also the Governor of Rhode Island. Together, they lived at 15 Washington Square and were the parents of:

- Gilbert Francklyn (1870–1957), an executive with the Consolidated Gas Company who did not marry.
- Doris Francklyn (1887–1959), a poet and teacher who lived in Southampton and who did not marry.

Francklyn died at his home, 160 East 91st Street in New York, on January 11, 1929. His funeral was held at St. George's Chapel in Stuyvesant Square and he was buried in Southampton.
