= Astor Trust Company =

- 1911 Logo
- Industry: Trust company
- Predecessor: Astor National Bank; Sixth National Bank; New Netherlands Trust Company
- Founded: 1898; 128 years ago
- Fate: Merged with Bankers Trust (1917)
- Headquarters: New York City, New York
- Key people: George Fisher Baker; Edmund C. Converse; Alexander Henry Stevens; Thomas Cochran
- Products: Financial services

Astor Trust Company was a historic American banking organization. The firm merged with Bankers Trust in 1917.

== History ==
The Astor National Bank of New York was authorized to begin business on February 9, 1898, with initial capital of $300,000. John Jacob Astor IV was the first depositor when the bank opened on February 14, 1898, with George Fisher Baker as president and Charles F. Bevins as cashier. The first days deposits totaled $700,000. The Bank was located in the Astor Court Building, (Note: The Astor Court Building was an office building built by John Jacob Astor IV to adjoin the Waldorf-Astoria Hotel, at 34th Street and Astor Court (just west of Fifth Avenue). Astor also founded an insurance company to insure the building (and his other building enterprises and completed buildings, as well as to do general insurance business, with J. Hampden Robb as president of the company).) adjoining the Waldorf-Astoria Hotel, at 34th Street and Astor Court (just west of Fifth Avenue). It was rumored that Jack Astor was "interested in the company and might be active in its management."

In 1899, Sixth National Bank (which was founded in 1864), of which Alexander Henry Stevens was then president, consolidated with the Astor National Bank. Stevens then became a vice-president of Astor National Bank, serving in that role until his death in 1916. By 1900, the Bank had $350,000 in capital. From 1906 to 1914, Thomas Cochran served as vice-president of the bank (Cochran became a partner in J.P. Morgan & Company in 1917). Edmund C. Converse served as president of Astor Trust from 1907 to 1917.

In 1907, Astor National Bank merged with the New Netherlands Trust Company to become the Astor Trust Company. New Netherland Trust Company had been organized in October 1906 by "interests identified with the Bankers' Trust Company". After the 1907 consolidation, the Astor Trust Company had capital of $1,250,000, and left the Astor Court Building, (Note: The newly formed Sherman National Bank of New York, of which former Vermont Governor Edward Curtis Smith as president, occupied the vacated offices of the Astor National Bank in the Astor Court Building at 34th Street and Astor Court (just west of Fifth Avenue).) and moved to 369 Fifth Avenue and 36th Street where New Netherland Trust was shortly to have begun business.

In 1912, during the Pujo Committee inquiry, Astor Trust was included in the presentation that showed that "eighteen financial institutions in New York, Chicago, and Boston virtually constituted a 'money trust,' having a voice through the places on the Board of Directors in the management of 134 corporations, with an aggregate capital of $25,325,000,000." Upon questioning by Samuel Untermyer, Scudder informed the committee that the 29 Astor Trust Co. directors held 64 directorships in 17 other banks and trust companies. Also in 1912, it was falsely reported that the Astor Trust Company was merging with the Jefferson and Century Banks.

=== Subsequent mergers ===
On April 23, 1917, the Astor Trust Company merged with Bankers Trust, which had been talked of for some time as both banks had a number of directors in common (e.g. Seward Prosser was president of the Bankers and a director of the Astor and Edmund C. Converse was president of the Astor and a director of the Bankers). The Astor continued "with no change in management, as the uptown branch of the Bankers Trust Company." The new company had capital of $11,250,000, "undivided profit of more than $5,000,000 and deposits of about $300,000,000." Bankers Trust was later acquired by Alex. Brown & Sons in 1997, however, Deutsche Bank agreed to purchase Bankers Trust for $10.1 billion in November 1998. Deutsche Bank sold The Trust and Custody division of Bankers Trust to State Street Corporation in February 2003.

=== Astor Trust Company building ===
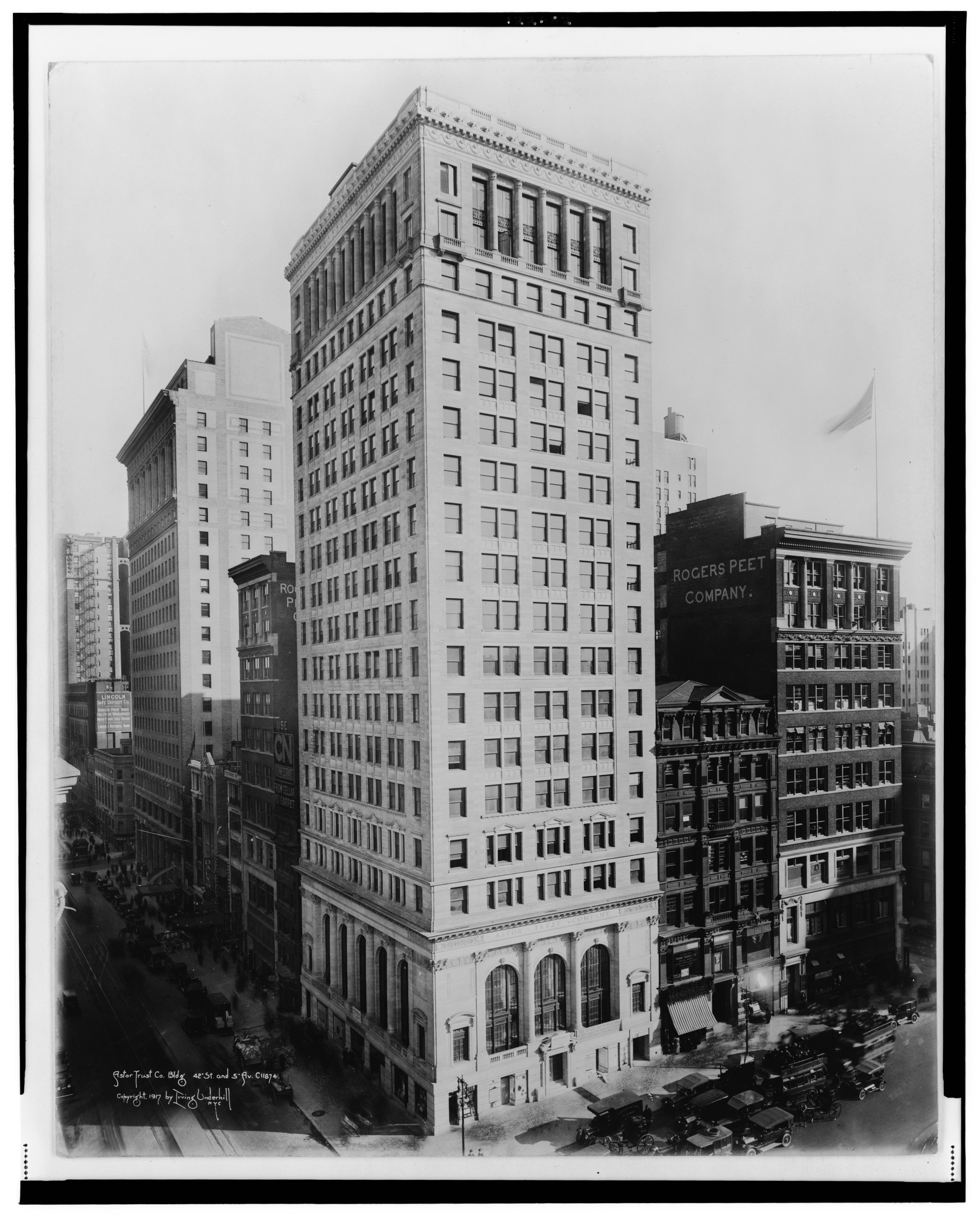
The Astor Trust Co. Building, 1917.

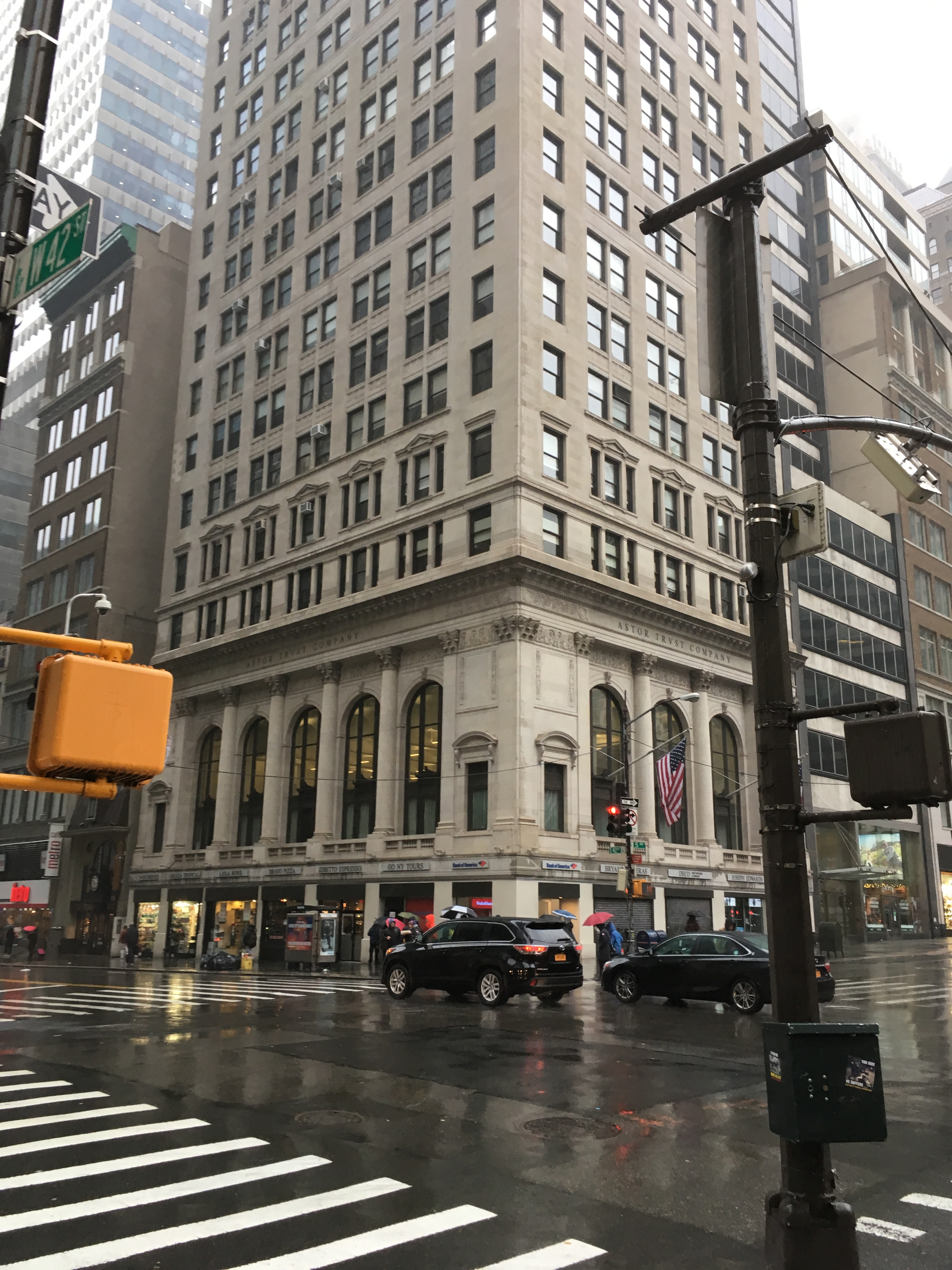
Astor Trust building in the 21st century

In 1915, the Oceanic Investment Company announced the construction of a new building at the southeast corner of Fifth Avenue and 42nd Street to replace a commercial building built by the Pottier & Stymus Company c. 1884 (which itself replaced the House of Mansions, which had been built in 1856 by Alexander J. Davis). The new building was named after the Astor Trust Company who was the new building's primary tenant after they took a 21-year lease and agreed to move from their existing offices at 389 Fifth Avenue (and 36th Street) into the new building upon its completion in 1917. Astor's old office was then occupied by the American Red Cross. In the new building:

"The ground floor will be devoted to stores, while the Astor Trust Company, now at Fifth Avenue and Thirty-sixth Street, will occupy the first, second, and third floors, also using the basement for safe deposit vaults. The main banking rooms, while occupying three floors, will be arranged as a single floor, with the ceiling rising thirty-five feet above the main banking room. Three lofty arched windows will overlook Fifth Avenue from the banking floor."

The building was designed by architect Montague Flagg (1883–1924), who was known for designing the Thomas Cook building at 565 Fifth Avenue. The Astor Trust Company building was eventually renamed the Bankers' Trust building, which stands to this day.

In 1919, Bankers Trust acquired its second uptown location at the northwest corner of Madison Avenue and 57th Street from the Union Trust Company and expanded its main location at 14 Wall Street and Nassau Street by acquiring the property adjacent to their headquarters (which was completed in 1912) from William Waldorf Astor, Baron Astor, for approximately $1,750,000.

== Affiliated people ==
=== Notable former employees ===
Notable employees of the bank included:

- George Fisher Baker (first president)
- Edmund C. Converse (president)
- Charles A. Peabody Jr. (first vice-president)
- Thomas Cochran (vice-president)
- Alexander Henry Stevens (vice-president)
- Seward Prosser (vice-president; president; later head of Bankers Trust)
- Charles F. Bevins (first cashier)
- George W. Pancoast (cashier)
- Harris Fahnestock (first assistant cashier)
- Howard Boocock (assistant secretary and treasurer); killed himself and his wife Adele at their home at 36 East 74th Street, in Manhattan on March 22, 1915.

=== Board of directors ===
Members of the board of directors of the Astor National Bank and Astor Trust Company included:

- Benjamin Altman (of B. Altman & Co.).
- John Jacob Astor IV
- Vincent Astor (Note: After the death of John Jacob Astor IV on the sinking of RMS Titanic in April 1912, his son, Vincent Astor, was elected to his father's seat on the Board of the Astor Trust Company.)
- William Waldorf Astor
- George Fisher Baker (also first president of the Astor)
- George B. Case (of White & Case)
- Thomas Cochran
- Edmund C. Converse
- Henry Pomeroy Davison (vice-president of First National Bank)
- John L. Downey
- Henry B. Ely
- Elbert Henry Gary (chairman of the board of U.S. Steel)
- Harrison E. Gawtry (of the Consolidated Gas Co.)
- Robert Walton Goelet
- Adrian Iselin Jr. (of Adrian Iselin & Co.)
- Thomas W. Lamont (second vice-president of Bankers Trust)
- Edgar L. Marston (of Blair & Co.)
- Gates W. McGarrah (president of Mechanic's National Bank) (Note: Mechanic's National Bank, which had merged with Manufacturers National Bank in 1904, later acquired the Fourth National Bank, the National Copper Bank, the Produce Exchange Bank, and the Lincoln Trust before Chase National Bank acquired it in 1926.)
- Robert H. McCurdy
- Charles A. Peabody Jr. (president of the Mutual Life Insurance Company)
- George Walbridge Perkins (J.P. Morgan & Co.)
- William H. Porter (president of Chemical National Bank)
- Seward Prosser
- William T. Rainey
- Roy A. Rainey
- Daniel G. Reid (of Chicago, Rock Island and Pacific Railroad)
- Douglas Robinson Jr. (brother-in-law of President Theodore Roosevelt, who was an Astor Trust customer)
- W. Emlen Roosevelt (president of Roosevelt Hospital and director of the Gallatin National Bank)
- Archibald D. Russell
- Alexander Henry Stevens
- John F. Thompson (vice-president of Bankers Trust)
- Charles L. Tiffany (vice-president of Tiffany & Co.)
- Theodore Newton Vail (president of American Telephone & Telegraph)
- Albert H. Wiggin (vice-president of Chase National Bank)
