= Harrison E. Gawtry =

American businessman

Harrison Edward Gawtry (November 28, 1840 – January 28, 1919) was an American businessman who was one of the organizers of the Consolidated Gas Company of New York, and served as president for more than ten years until his retirement in December 1904

== Early life ==
Gawtry was born on November 28, 1840, in New York City. He was a son of Woolen merchant William M. Gawtry (1808–1893), who emigrated from England to New York in 1821, and his first wife, Harriet Hedden. After the death of his mother, his father married Anne Eliza Walker in 1857. His paternal grandfather, John Gawtry, was born at Elvington, near York, in 1773 and died in Geneva, New York, in 1847.

During the U.S. Civil War, Gawtry served with Company K of the 7th Regiment, New York.

== Career ==
In 1878, Gawtry became interested in the Municipal Gas Light Company together with Charles G. Francklyn. In 1884, Gawtry and Francklyn led the merger of six gas companies (including the Municipal Gas Light Company, the New York Gas Light Company, the Manhattan Gas Light Company, and the Metropolitan Gas Light Company) which combined into the Consolidated Gas Company on November 10, 1884. Gawtry he was a member of the first board of trustees and served as the company's first secretary. He was elected treasurer in 1886 and, in January 1894, he became president. During his presidency, the Company acquired practically all of the gas and electric light companies doing business in Manhattan, the Bronx and Long Island City.

Gawtry resigned as president in December 1904, but was elected chairman of the board of trustees and of the company’s executive committee. He resigned his chairmanship in 1917. At the time of his death in 1919, he was the last remaining trustee of the original board of trustees of the Consolidated Gas Company. Consolidated Gas later purchased Thomas Edison's Edison Illuminating Company and became known as the modern day firm of Consolidated Edison.

In addition he was vice president of the New York Mutual Gas Light Company, and a member of the board of trustees of the New York Edison Company, the Consolidated Telegraph & Electrical Subway Company, the Northern Union Gas Company, the Northern Westchester Lighting Company, the Peekskill Lighting & Railroad Company. Shortly before his death, he had resigned as director of all of the subsidiary companies of the Consolidated Gas Company of New York. Gawtry also served as a trustee of the Astor Trust Company, Union Trust Company, and the Fulton Trust Company among other financial institutions.

== Personal life ==
In 1866, Gawtry was married to Emma Louise Brown (1841–1912), a daughter of Emma (née Manning) Brown and Lewis B. Brown, a founder of Elberon, New Jersey. Together, they were the parents of:

- Lewis Brown Gawtry (1869–1954), who married Olive Van Rensselaer, a daughter of Kiliaen Van Rensselaer and Olivia (née Atterbury) Van Rensselaer, in 1899.
- Helen Gawtry (1870–1961), who married Dr. Howard Dennis Collins (1868–1947), a son of George and Anna Maria (née Taft) Collins, in 1895.

He was a member of the Union League Club, the Union Club and Tuxedo Clubs, Chamber of Commerce of New York, New-York Historical Society, the American Museum of Natural History, Metropolitan Museum of Art, Sons of the Revolution and Seventh Regiment Veterans' Association.

His wife Emma died on October 29, 1912. After several years of poor health, Gawtry died on January 28, 1919, at 33 East 57th Street, his residence in New York City.

=== Descendants ===
Through his son Lewis, he was a grandfather of Olive Van Rensselaer Gawtry (1901–1980), who married Robert W. Tilney in 1936, and Beatrice Gawtry, who married José A. Machado Jr. in 1932

Through his daughter Helen, he was a grandfather of Dorothy Collins (1901–1998), who married Willem van Tets (former Consul-General of the Netherlands in San Francisco) in 1929, and Hugh Gawtry Collins (1905–1999), who married Frances Oliver Fisher in 1931.
