= Alison Taylor =

Al(l)ison Taylor may refer to:

- Alison Elizabeth Taylor (born 1972), American artist
- Alison Taylor (bishop), assistant bishop in the Anglican Diocese of Brisbane
- Alison Taylor (curler) (born 1987), Canadian curler
- Allison Taylor, 24 character
- Allison Taylor (Simpsons character)
- Alison Taylor (politician), Scottish politician
