= Conyers Farm =

Tract of land in Greenwich, Connecticut, US

Coordinates: 41.136°N 73.646°W

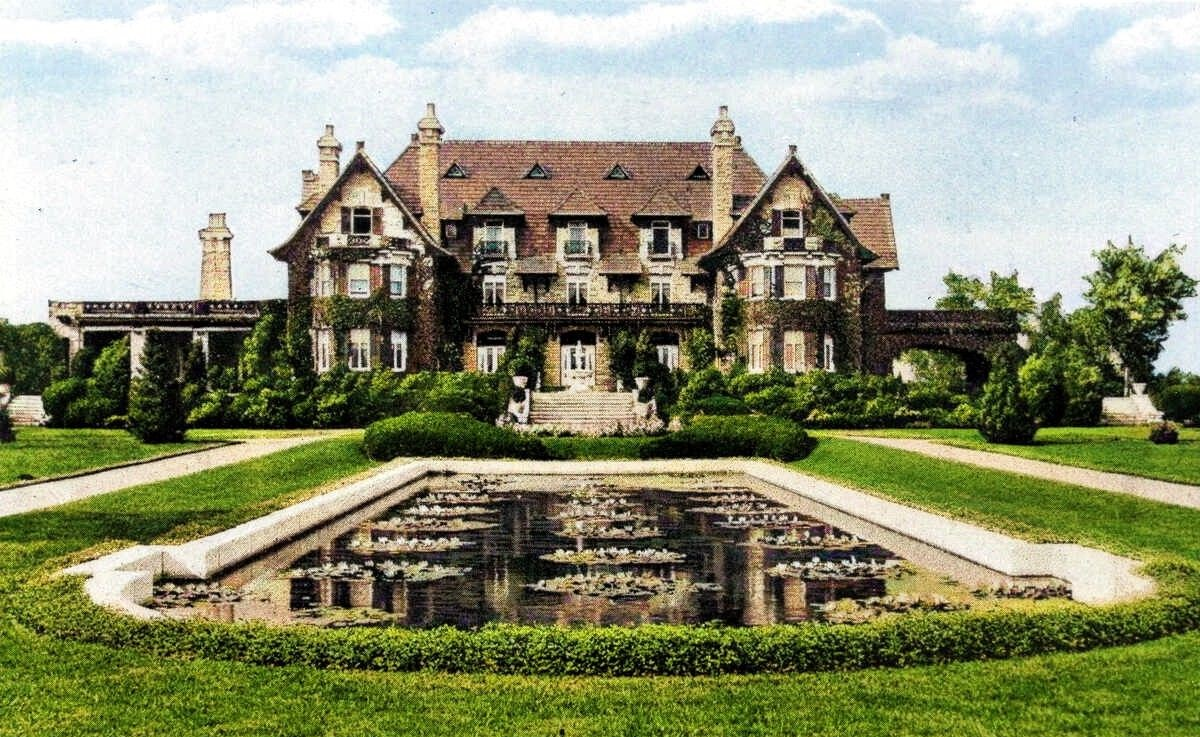
E.C Converse Mansion

Conyers Farm is a tract of land in Greenwich, Connecticut, near the New York-Connecticut border. Established by Edmund C. Converse of Bankers Trust in 1904, the property represented the consolidation of 20 farms. Much of the land had long been uncultivated, but the farm became an important source of employment and food for Greenwich. The 1,481-acre (599 ha) site was unoccupied for 15 years after Converse's death. Conyers Farm was repurposed for luxury home development in the 1980s and several celebrities have owned property there since that time.

== History ==
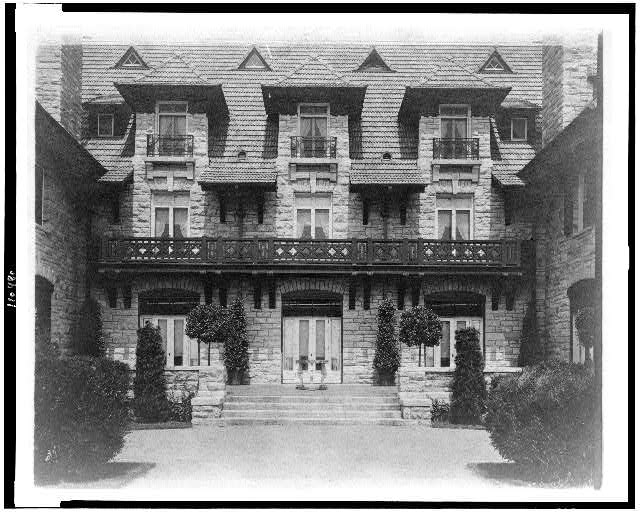
A portion of the facade of Converse's home on Conyers Farm

Conyers Farm was established by Bankers Trust President Edmund C. Converse in 1904. It was named after the Old English spelling of Converse's name. To acquire the land for Conyers Farm, Converse purchased and consolidated 20 farms. Initially, he was the sole owner of the property, which consisted of a main house and several other buildings that served as quarters for 200 workers that maintained the farm.

When Conyers Farm was established, the land required a great deal of work. Ditches had to be dug and loose stones and boulders covered the soil. Much of the land had not been cultivated in a generation. A layer of dry, hard matter sat a few inches below the topsoil, necessitating the installation of subsurface drainage. A 1908 issue of American Homes and Gardens said that while apple orchards on the property initially seemed lost, they had been restored to pristine condition. By that time, Conyers Farm also housed one of Converse's daughters and his brother's widow.

The farm flourished and became a source of food and employment for Greenwich residents. Eggs, butter and milk were produced, and cows, pigs and poultry were raised there. In addition to its manor house, Conyers Farm had a large stone storage barn, a 40-foot clock tower, several greenhouses and one of the grandest music rooms in the United States, which included a pipe organ valued at $50,000. Conyers Lake ran through the property and water flowed into two water towers, which had capacities of 22,500 gallons and 35,000 gallons.

The farm was unoccupied from Converse's death in 1921 to 1936. Converse was the first president of Bankers Trust, and the group took over ownership of the farm for several years. A new owner purchased Conyers Farm in 1927 and planned to renovate it, but the Great Depression set in and the renovations never took place. Lewis Rosenstiel, a liquor magnate, purchased the land in 1936. He attempted to change zoning rules for the property so that 83 acres (34 ha) of it could be divided into 0.25-acre (0.10 ha) parcels. He also wanted to erect office buildings on the land. After a legal battle, Rosenstiel decided to leave the land mostly untouched.

In 1980, businessman Peter M. Brant purchased Conyers Farm for $18 million. At the time, it represented one of the largest plots of undeveloped land near a large city. A devoted polo player, Brant said that he hoped to develop a community of people who were polo enthusiasts. The land at Conyers Farm was sold in lots of at least 10 acres (4.0 ha) each. There were 95 lots for sale. By 1986, about half were sold and the remaining lots were priced between $800,000 and $1.5 million each.

In 2004, an 80-acre (32 ha) property on Conyers Farm sold for $45 million. By 2006, the size of a planned home in Conyers Farm had generated public debate. A hedge fund manager purchased 11 acres (4.5 ha) in the community and planned a home with a 39,000-square-foot (3,600 m^{2}) main house. The home could have become the largest in Greenwich, depending on how it would have been measured. The site's owner requested a permit to build the house, which is required for any home over 15,000 square feet (1,400 m^{2}). The man dropped the request amid public criticism of the projected size of the home.

President Barack Obama attended a dinner in 2010 at a home on Conyers Farm which raised $1 million for the Democratic National Committee. As of May 2014, the Conyers Farm home of film director Ron Howard was one of three houses in Greenwich listed on the market at prices above $25 million. Howard's family came to Greenwich in the 1980s, moving into their 32-acre (13 ha) Conyers Farm home several years later. While the Howard family has spent holidays at Conyers Farm in recent years, they have spent more and more time in California.

== Notable residents ==
In addition to Howard's family, several notable people have lived on or owned property on Conyers Farm. In the 1980s, tennis players Ivan Lendl and Wojciech Fibak each purchased land there. Other celebrities who have owned property on Conyers Farm include pro-wrestling mogul Vince McMahon, former Administrator of the Small Business Administration Linda McMahon, actress Jessica Biel, actor Tom Cruise, basketball player Allan Houston, politician David Stockman and newscaster Paula Zahn.
