= Erastus S. Prosser =

American politician (1809–1888)

Member of the New York State Senate for the 31st District
- In office 1859–1861
- Preceded by: James Wadsworth
- Succeeded by: John Ganson

Personal details
- Born: Erastus Sabinus Prosser; September 2, 1809 Westerlo, New York
- Died: May 11, 1888 (aged 78) Buffalo, New York
- Party: Democrat; Free Soil Party; Republican Party
- Relations: Seward Prosser (grandson)

Erastus Sabinus Prosser (September 2, 1809 – May 11, 1888) was an American politician from New York.

== Early life ==
Prosser was born on September 2, 1809, in the area which was separated as the Town of Westerlo, Albany County, New York in 1815. His father was a medical doctor with a country practice.

At an early age he removed to Albany, New York, and served as a clerk in the forwarding house of Dows & Cary there.

== Career ==
In 1845, Prosser moved to Buffalo, New York, and continued his business there until about 1858 when he retired. He remained involved in canal matters, including the Erie Canal, throughout his life.

Prosser entered politics as a Democrat, but his "Anti-slavery proclivities led him into the support of Mr. Van Buren for the Presidency" and he joined the Free Soil Party in 1848, and the Republican Party upon its foundation in 1855. He was a member of the New York State Senate (31st D.) from 1859 to 1861, sitting in the 82nd, 83rd and 84th New York State Legislatures.

He was a delegate to the New York State Constitutional Convention of 1867 to 1868.

== Personal life ==
Senator Prosser is rather prepossessing in his personal appearance, being about medium in height, with an active frame, sharp, grey eyes, and a bushy, iron-grey beard; and wears a cheerful good-natured, though dignified and somewhat reserved expression upon his countenance which, at once, gives assurance of the real man.

— Biographical Sketches of the State Officers and Members of the Legislature of the State of New York, 1859

Prosser was married three times and in 1877 was sued by Anna A. Hickey, a woman who claimed he proposed but refused to marry her. In 1834, he married Lucy Wilbur, and they had four children, including:

- Henry Wilbur Prosser, who married Anna Fay.
- Ms. Prosser, who married John Armstrong of New York.
- Harriet Prosser (1836–1909), who married to Chief Judge William C. Ruger.
- Anna Weed Prosser (1846–1902), who did not marry but adopted three children; she was involved in the Divine Healing Movement of the late 1800s with Carrie Judd Montgomery.

After the death of his first wife, he married Kate Muldary, a native of Brooklyn, New York. They lived at 786 Delaware Avenue in Buffalo. In 1880, Kate committed suicide by jumping from the roof of a five-story tenement at 430 East 14th Street in New York City. He married, thirdly, to Mary A. Finnegan of Buffalo.

Prosser died in Buffalo on May 11, 1888. He was buried at the Forest Lawn Cemetery, Buffalo.

=== Descendants ===
Through his son Henry, he was a grandfather of the banker and philanthropist Seward Prosser (1871–1942), who served as the head of Bankers Trust.

New York State Senate
Preceded by James Wadsworth	New York State Senate; 31st District; 1859–1861	Succeeded by John Ganson
