= Seward Prosser =

American banker (1871–1942)

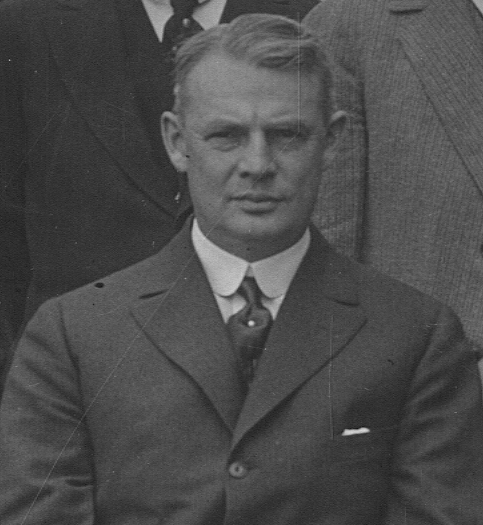
- Prosser in 1917
- Born: March 1, 1871; Buffalo, New York, U.S.
- Died: October 1, 1942 (aged 71); Woods Hole, Massachusetts, U.S.
- Education: Englewood School for Boys
- Occupations: Banker, philanthropist
- Spouse: Constance Barber (m. 1902)
- Children: 3
- Relatives: Erastus S. Prosser (grandfather)

Seward Prosser (March 1, 1871 – October 1, 1942) was an American banker and philanthropist who served as the head of Bankers Trust.

== Early life ==
Prosser was born in Buffalo, New York on March 1, 1871. He was a son of Henry Wilbur Prosser and Anna (née Fay) Prosser. Among his siblings was Mason Fay Prosser, an attorney in Honolulu, Hawaii.

His family later moved to Brooklyn, where he was educated in the public schools before attending the Englewood School for Boys in Englewood, New Jersey.

== Career ==
Prosser began his career with Equitable Life Assurance Society of the United States. He later became a member Prosser & Homans, representing Equitable Life. From 1907 to 1912, he served as vice president of the Astor Trust Company.

Beginning in 1912, he served as president Liberty National Bank until 1914 when he became president of Bankers Trust. He served as president until 1923 when he relinquished the presidency but continued to serve as a director, Chairman of the board of trustees, and a member of the Executive Committee.

Prosser also served as a director of many prominent companies, including the General Electric Company, the Astor Trust Company, Tobacco Products Corporation, the American Surety Company, the Bankers Safe Deposit Company, the International Nickel Company of Canada, the Kennecott Copper Corporation, the Graphite Metallizing Corporation, the Braden Copper Company, and the Utah Copper Company, among others.

== Personal life ==
On October 25, 1902, Prosser was married to the English-born Constance Barber. Together, they lived in Englewood, New Jersey and in Woods Hole, Massachusetts (on Cape Cod), were the parents of:

- Barbara Prosser (1903–1984), who married John Archer Gifford (1900–1989), an attorney.
- Anna Fay Prosser (1907–1973), who married Dan Platt Caulkins in 1927. They divorced and she later married Leighton Hale Stevens (1903–1969). in 1939.
- Constance Mary Prosser (1910–1980), who married Vance McCaulley in 1929. After his death in 1935, she married Richard King Mellon, president of Pittsburgh's Mellon National Bank, in 1936. After his death in 1970, she married the director of the National Stud, Peter Eustace Burrell, CBE, a son of Sir Merrik Burrell, 7th Baronet.

He was a member of the Union League Club and the University Club of New York.

Prosser died at his home in Woods Hole on October 1, 1942. His funeral was held at the First Presbyterian Church of Englewood, and more than 1,000 persons attended with more than 40 friends and associates noted as honorary pallbearers. His widow died in July 1948.

=== Descendants ===
Through his eldest daughter, he was a grandfather of Prosser Gifford, a Director for the Office of Scholarly Programs in the Library of Congress who wrote a series on British and German colonialism in Africa.
