= Addison Gallery of American Art =

Coordinates: 42°38′55″N 71°8′0″W

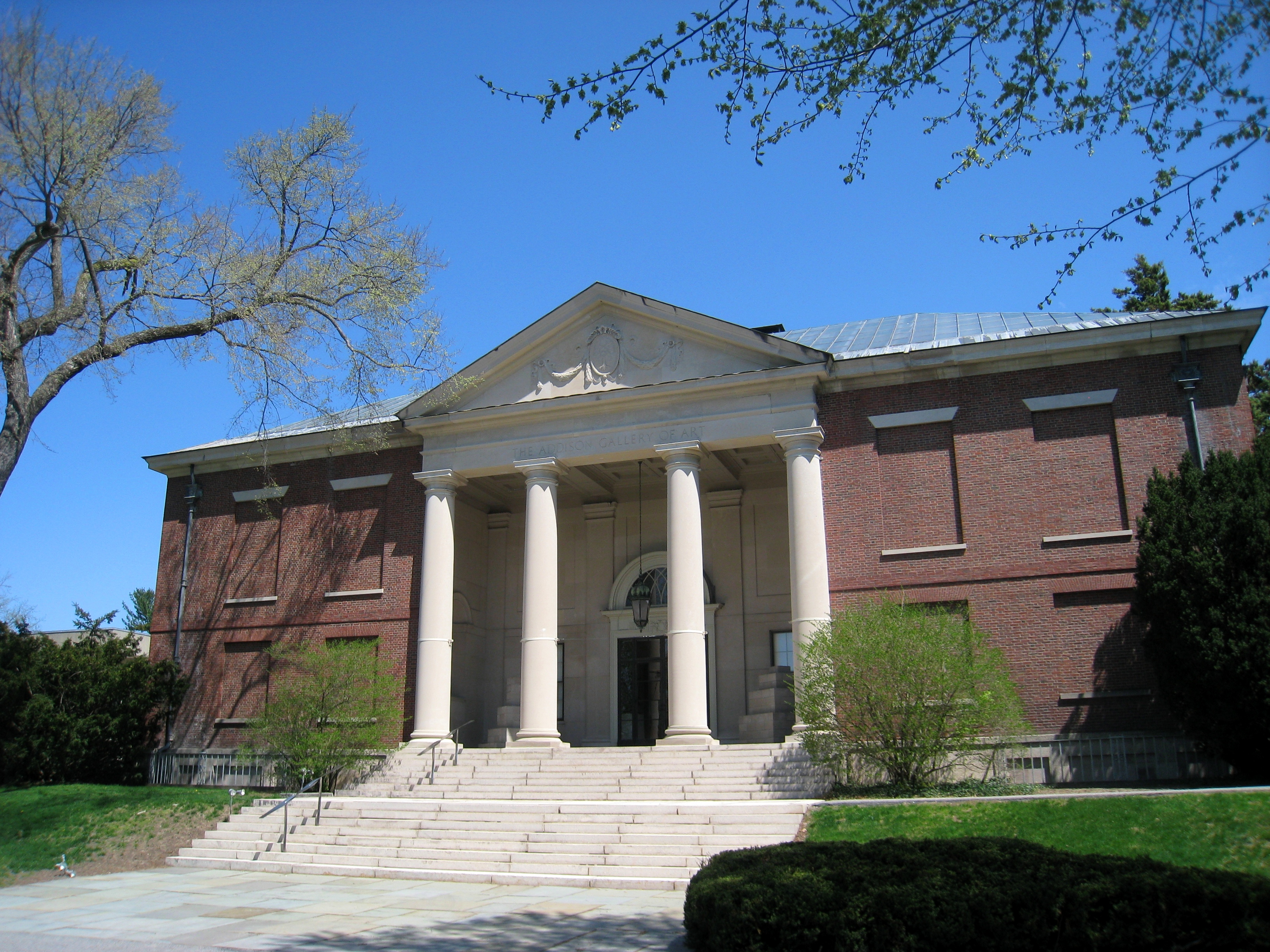
- This view of the neoclassical entry to the Addison Gallery does not reveal the modernist sections of the building
- Established: 1931
- Location: Andover, Massachusetts
- Type: Academic museum
- Collections: American art
- Website: addison.andover.edu

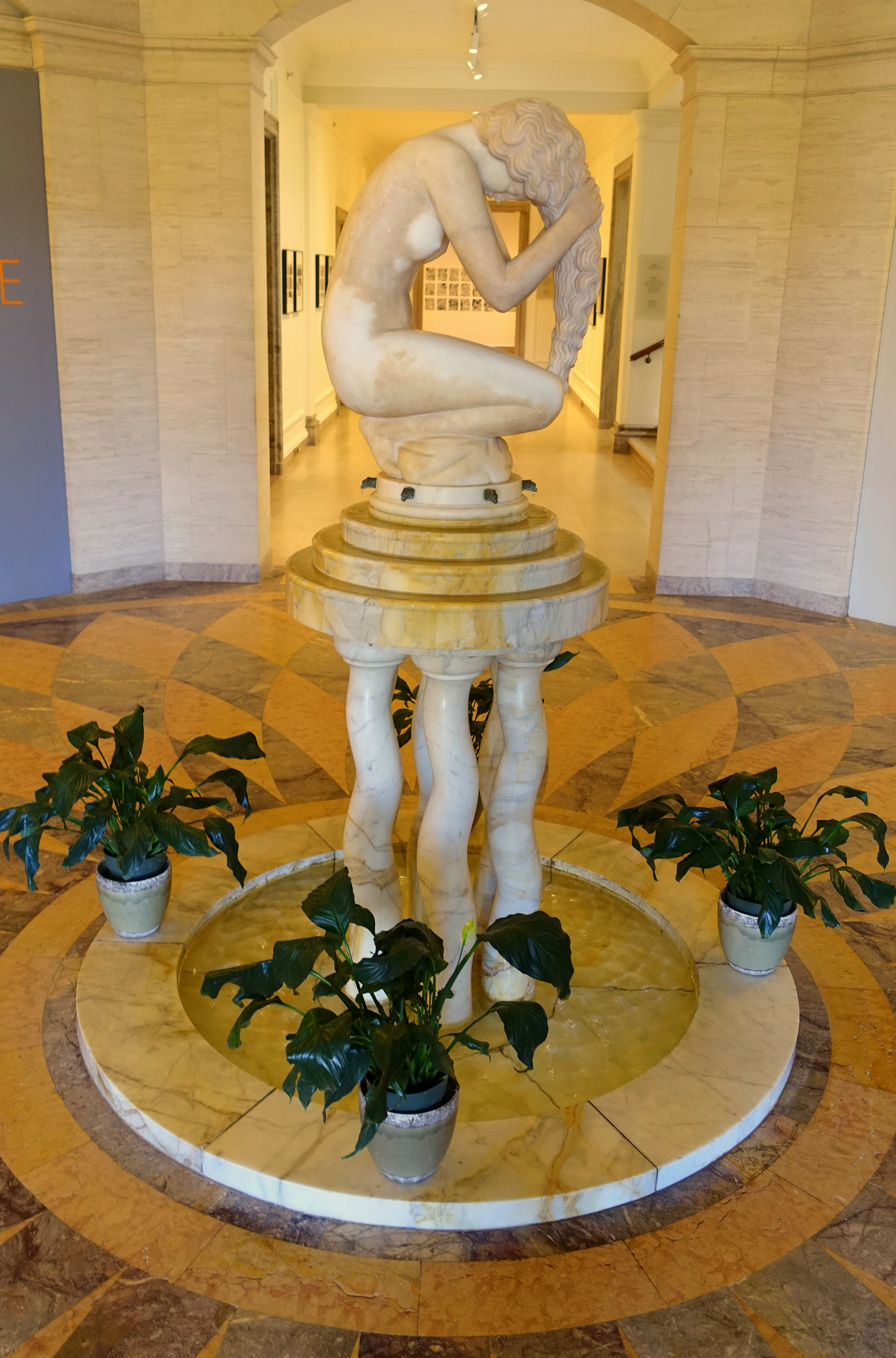
Venus Anadyomene (1927) by Paul Manship greets visitors at the entry to the museum

The Addison Gallery of American Art is an academic museum dedicated to collecting American art, organized as a department of Phillips Academy in Andover, Massachusetts.

== History ==
The gallery was created by Phillips Academy alumnus and benefactor Thomas Cochran in 1931 to mark the school's 150th anniversary. Cochran also donated 50 paintings to start the collection. The Addison Gallery is named after Cochran's late friend Keturah Addison Cobb. The building was designed by architect Charles A. Platt.

Directors of the gallery include Bartlett H. Hayes, Jr. (1940–1969), Christopher C. Cook (1969–1989), Jock Reynolds (1989–1998), Adam D. Weinberg (1999–2003), Brian T. Allen (2004–2013), Judith F. Dolkart (2014–2019), and Allison N. Kemmerer (2021-).

In the spring of 2006, the Phillips Academy Board of Trustees approved a $30 million campaign to renovate and expand the Addison Gallery. Construction on the Addison began in the middle of 2008 and was completed in 2010. The project was designed by Centerbrook Architects & Planners.

== Collection ==
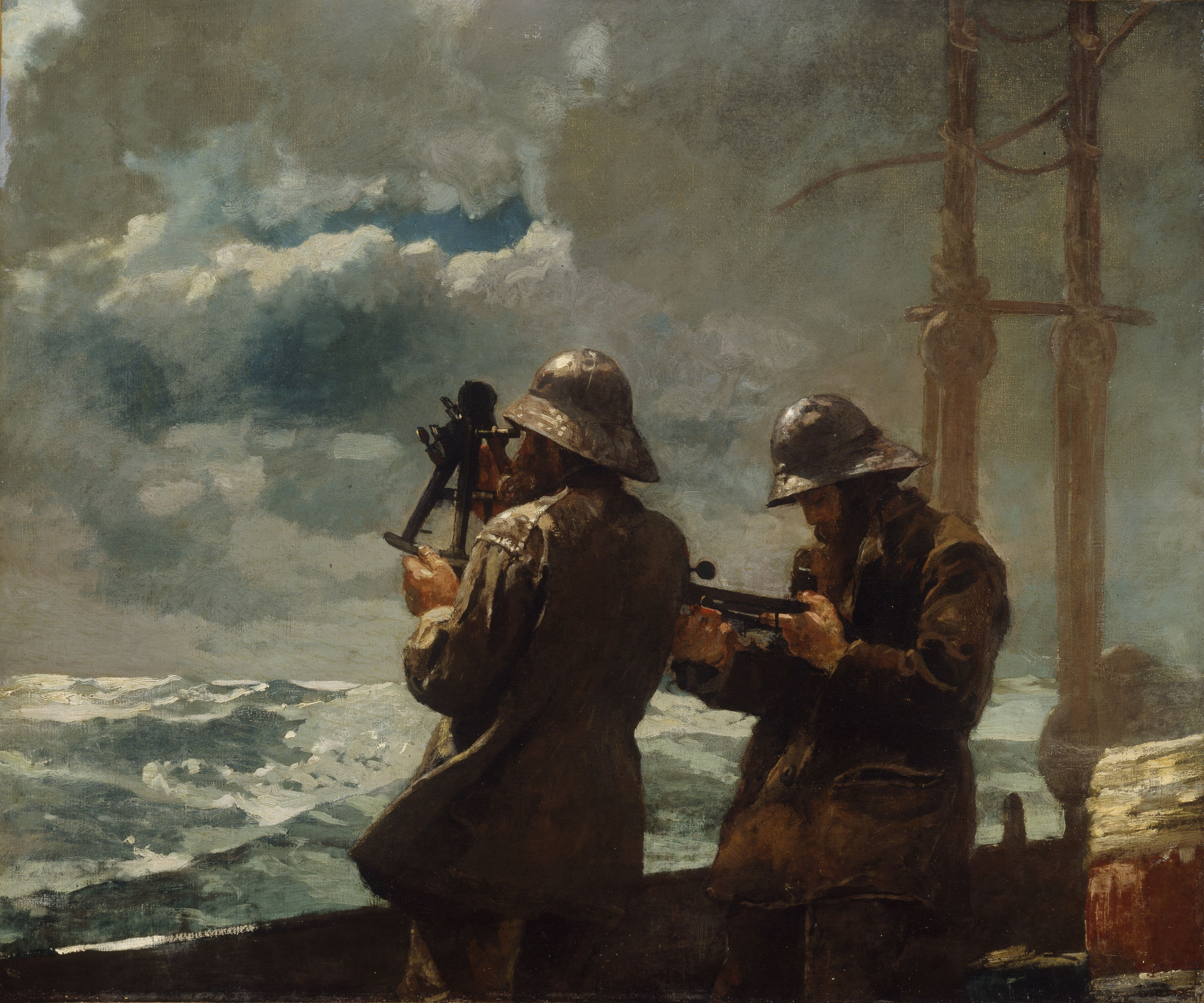
Winslow Homer's Eight Bells, part of the Addison Gallery's permanent collection

The Addison Gallery of American Art's founding collection included major works by such prominent American artists as John Singleton Copley, Thomas Eakins, Winslow Homer, Maurice Prendergast, John Singer Sargent, John Twachtman, and James McNeill Whistler. Purchasing and generous gifts have added works by such artists as George Bellows, Alexander Calder, Stuart Davis, Arthur Dove, Marsden Hartley, Hans Hofmann, Edward Hopper, Knox Martin, Georgia O'Keeffe, Jackson Pollock, Frederic Remington, Charles Sheeler, Frank Stella, John Sloan, Benjamin West and Andrew Wyeth. It also has paintings by John Kensett, Frederic Church, George Inness, Dwight Tryon, Ralph Blakelock, John Singer Sargent, Josef Albers, Mary Cassatt, and Phillip Guston. The vaulted ceiling of one upstairs gallery features Wall Drawing #713, painted by Sol LeWitt in 1993.

The Addison's collection of 16,000 photographs spans the history of American photography and includes in-depth holdings of key individual artists, such as Lewis Baltz, Walker Evans, Robert Frank, Eadweard Muybridge, Carleton Watkins, Margaret Bourke-White, and Ansel Adams. In recent years, the Gallery has acquired significant contemporary works by Emery Bopp, Carroll Dunham, Kerry James Marshall, Joel Shapiro, and Lorna Simpson.

As of 2026, the collection comprises over 29,000 works in all media, including painting, sculpture, photography, drawings, prints, and decorative arts from the eighteenth century to the present. It also has a collection of models of American ships, including the Half Moon, Mayflower, and the yacht Wanderer.

== Education ==
Education at the Addison is grounded in the intention of its founding contributor, Thomas Cochran whose aim was “to enrich permanently the lives of the students.” The Addison welcomes Phillips Academy classes, as well as field trips from elementary and high schools of Essex county and beyond.

== Exhibitions ==
The Gallery presents a combination of twelve temporary exhibitions and permanent collection installations per year. Recent examples include:

- American Vanguards: Graham, Davis, Gorky, De Kooning and Their Circle (2012)
- An American in London: Whistler and the Thames (2014)
- Laurie Simmons: in and Around the House (2016)
- Mark Tobey: Threading Light (2017)
- Mel Kendrick: Seeing Things in Things (2021)
- Rosamond Purcell: Nature Stands Aside (2022)
- Alison Elizabeth Taylor: The Sum of It (2023)
- America in the Making (2026)
List of exhibits

Artist/Theme	Year
Sol Lewitt	1993

== Gallery ==
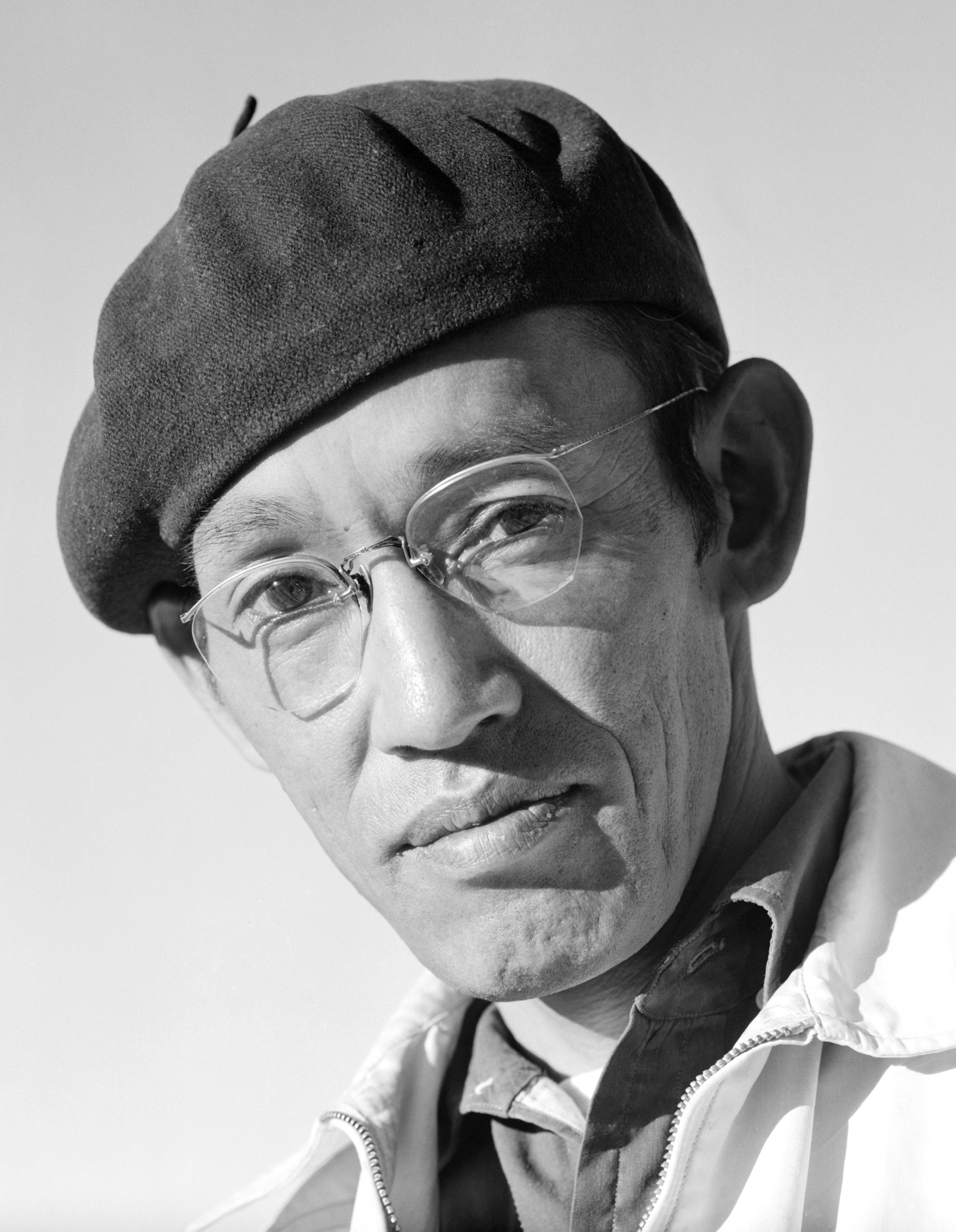

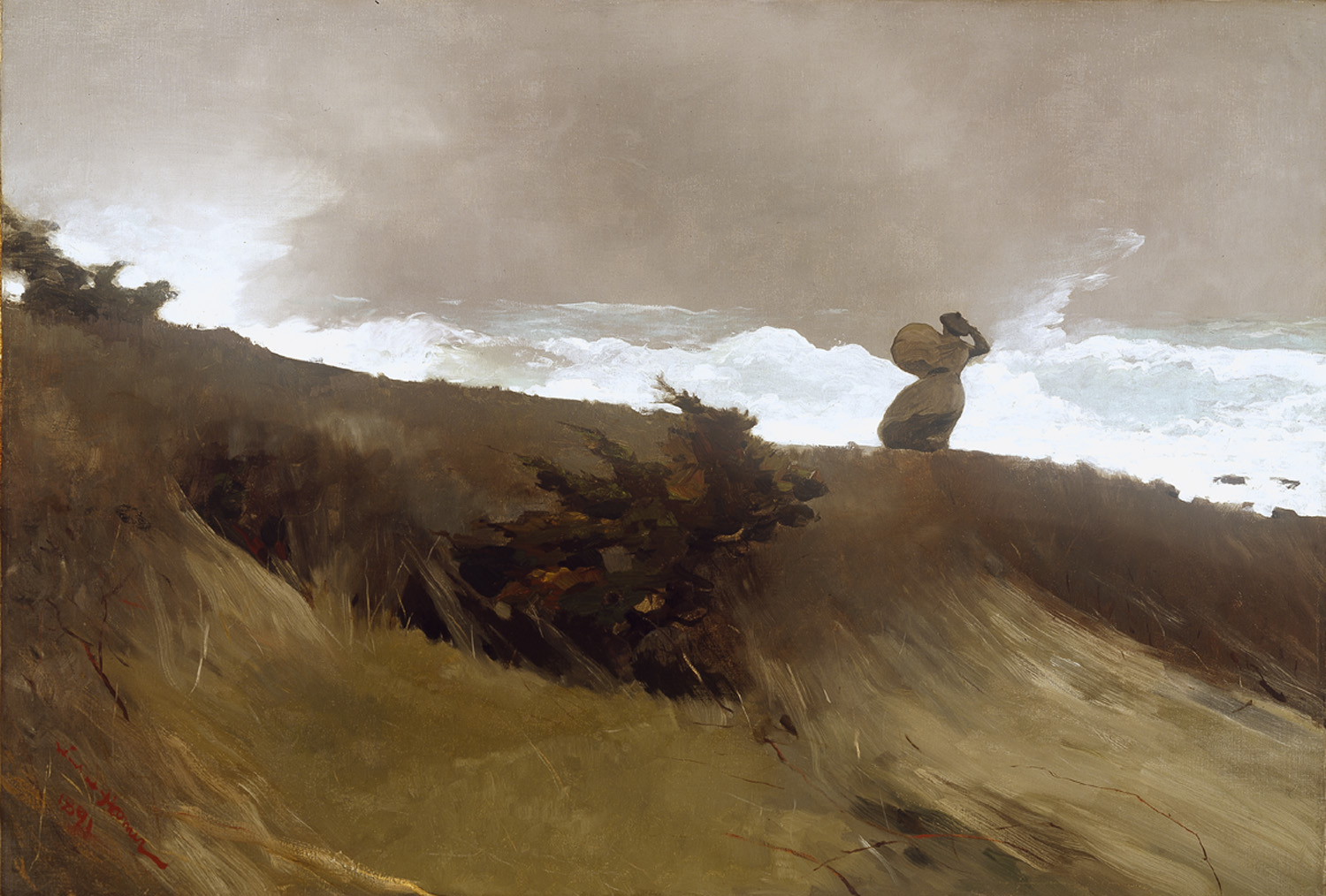
