= Anna Weed Prosser =

American evangelist (1846–1902)

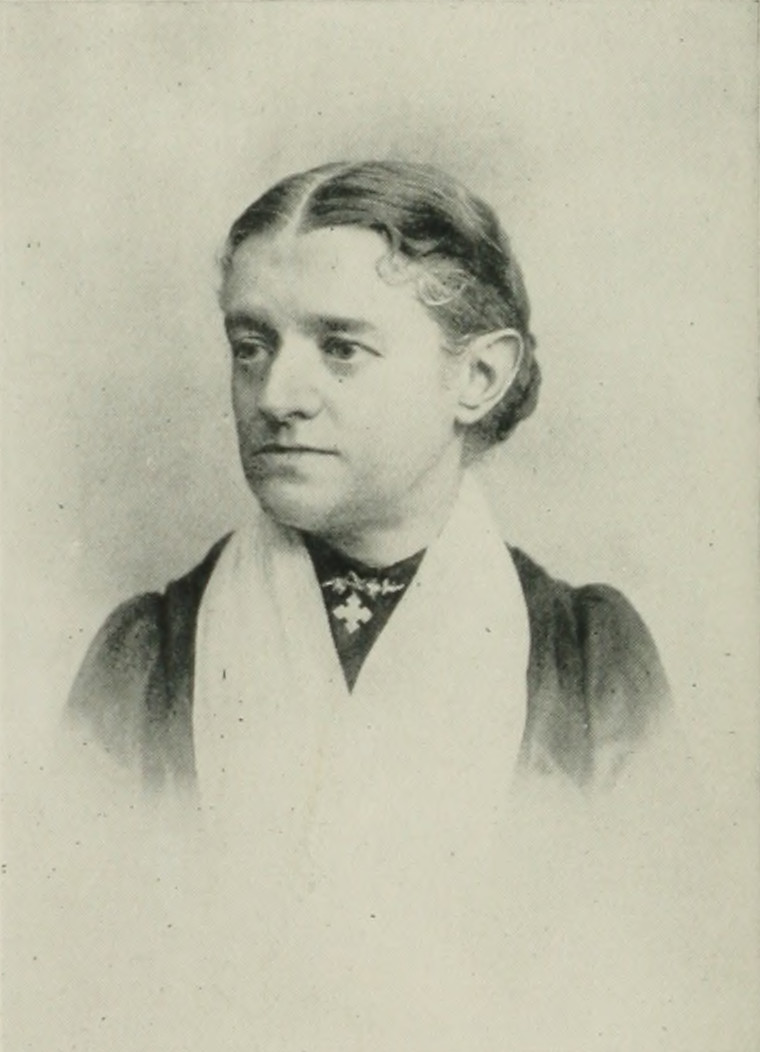
- "A Woman of the Century"

Personal life
- Born: October 15, 1846 Albany, New York, U.S.
- Died: December 20, 1902 (aged 56) Buffalo, New York, U.S.
- Resting place: Forest Lawn Cemetery, Buffalo
- Children: 3 adopted children
- Parent: Erastus S. Prosser (father)

Religious life
- Religion: Christianity
- Institute: Missionary Training School, Buffalo
- Profession: Evangelist

Anna Weed Prosser (October 15, 1846 – December 20, 1902) was an American evangelist. An invalid for many years, she believed her recovery due to prayer, and immediately entered upon her evangelical work in gratitude for her restored health. She worked for some time under the Woman's Christian Temperance Union (W.C.T.U.), ultimately establishing a mission of her own, known as the Old Canal Street Mission, in Buffalo, New York of which she took charge and was assisted in this work by reformed men whom she had saved from lives of destitution. After ten years spent in ministry among the poor and unfortunate, she entered the general evangelical work and became president of the Buffalo Branch of the National Christian Alliance.

== Early life and education ==
Anna Weed Prosser was born in Albany, New York, October 15, 1846. Her parents were Erastus S. Prosser and Lucy (née, Wilbur) Prosser. Anna had one brother, Henry Wilbur Prosser, and two sisters, including Harriet.

At the age of seven years, she removed to Buffalo, New York, where she was reared in a luxurious home. As early as four years of age, she recalled deep stirrings of conscience at times and heart-longings after God. At the age of fifteen, she entered the Sunday school of the Presbyterian Church in the neighborhood.

== Career ==
Leaving school very young, she began the usual career expected of a woman in her circumstance, that of a "society" girl. Gradually, her health failed under the incessant strain, until she was taken with a congestive chill, which was followed by a serious illness. She was carried to her room, and ten years of invalidism followed. Two of those years she spent in bed, and for five years, she was carried up and down stairs. One disease followed another, until finally, all physicians failing, she was removed from home on a mattress. After dedicating her life to the Christian religion, she returned to her home.

She took up city mission work under the W.C.T.U., where she worked for several years. From 1883, Prosser carried on rescue work in Canal Street, Buffalo. She took charge of the Canal Street Mission in Buffalo, of which she undertook the charge, assisted by her Bible class of reformed men. Her musical talent became the most prominent feature of her work.

About ten years after beginning this ministry, she received many calls from churches throughout the country and several invitations to assume the pastorate of a church. she entered general evangelistic work, and assumed the presidency of the Buffalo Branch of the National Christian Alliance. It was composed of members of various evangelical churches. About 1896, she established the Mionnary Training School to which work she brought an inheritance of US$12,000. For five years, she was president of the Christian Alliance, and for some time, conducted a Jewish mission.

== Personal life ==
Prosser made her home in Kenmore, a suburb bordering Buffalo. She adopted two daughters, Olive and Georgia Plumstell, and one adopted son, John Reece.

On December 20, 1902, Anna Weed Prosser died at the Missionary Training School in Buffalo, which she founded, and of which she was superintendent. Burial was at Forest Lawn Cemetery, Buffalo.
