= Edmund C. Converse =

American businessman

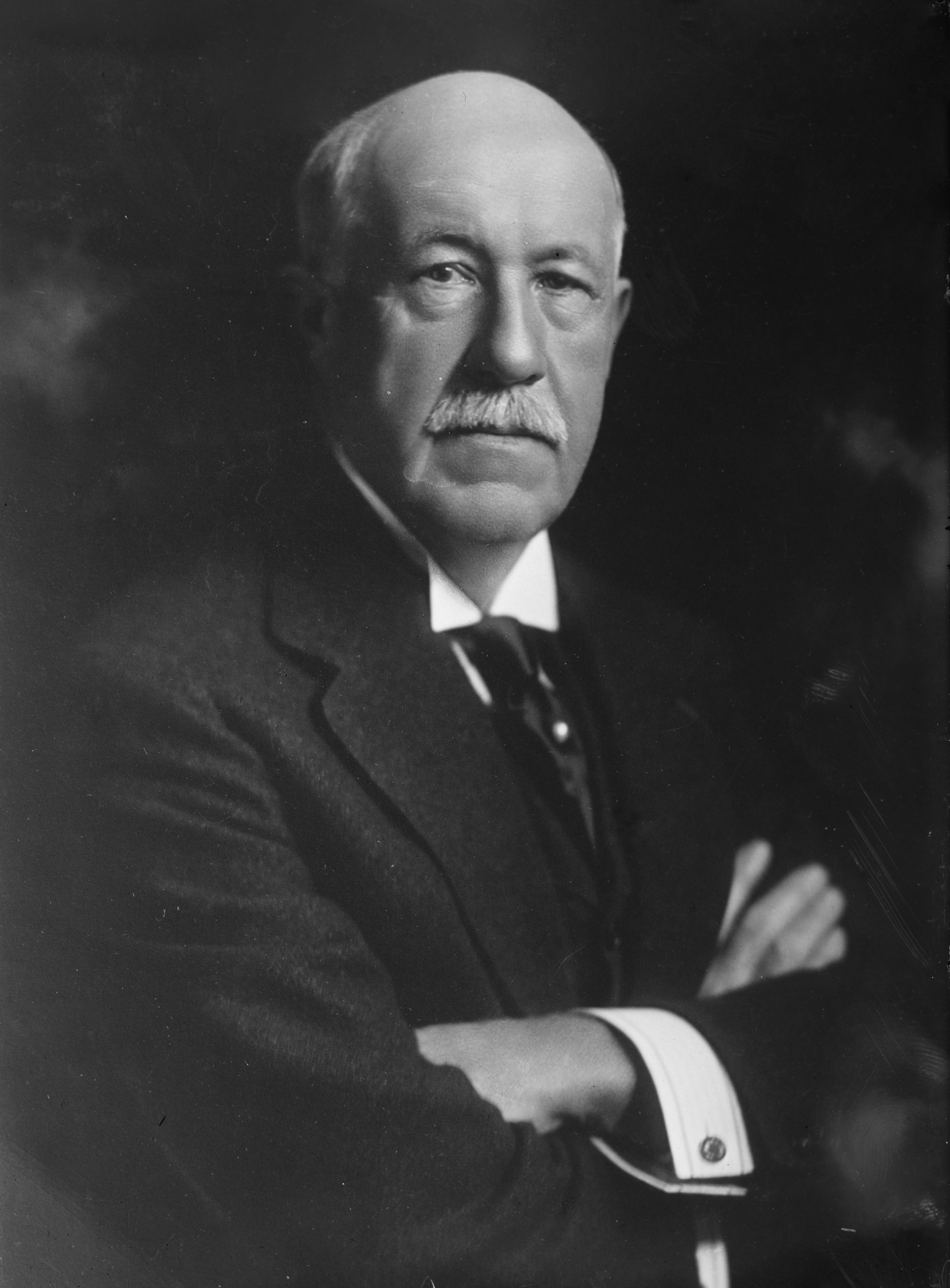
- Born: November 7, 1849; Boston, Massachusetts, U.S.
- Died: April 21, 1921 (aged 71); Pasadena, California, U.S.
- Occupations: Steel entrepreneur, banker
- Title: First president, Bankers Trust

Edmund Cogswell Converse (November 7, 1849 – April 4, 1921) was an American businessman, banker and baseball executive. He was a steel industry executive and participated in mergers that unified much of the American steel industry. Later, continuing an association with J. P. Morgan, he was the first president of Bankers Trust. Late in his life, he consolidated 20 farms to create the 1,481-acre (599 ha) tract known as Conyers Farm in Greenwich, Connecticut. Conyers Farm remained unoccupied for 15 years after Converse's death.

== Early life and career ==
Converse was born in Boston. After graduating from Boston Latin School in 1869, he secured an apprenticeship in McKeesport, Pennsylvania, with National Tube Works. He held several patents on improvements to tubing, such as lock-joints. After his innovations brought in several million dollars in sales, he became general manager of the company in 1889. Converse purchased a lot on 78th Street in New York City from railroad executive Henry H. Cook in the late 1890s. He had C. P. H. Gilbert build his house at 3 East 78th Street.

Converse moved to Greenwich, Connecticut, several years later, buying 20 farms and consolidating them into the 1,489-acre (603 ha) Conyers Farm, which he named after the Old English spelling of his family name. In addition to cows, pigs and poultry, the farm had apple, pear and peach orchards; butter, eggs and milk were produced there. Conyers Farm was unoccupied from Converse's 1921 death to 1936. Since the farm began accommodating luxury homes in the 1980s, several celebrities have lived there, including Tom Cruise, Ron Howard and Jessica Biel.

In 1899, he and William Nelson Cromwell facilitated the J. P. Morgan-funded merger of National Tube Works with 20 other companies, resulting in an enterprise known as the National Tube Company. Within two years, another Morgan-financed merger resulted in U.S. Steel. He served on the board of directors of U.S. Steel until 1916.

Converse became the president of two banks in 1903, Liberty National Bank and Bankers Trust. He led Liberty National Bank until 1907 and Bankers Trust until 1913. He was the president of Astor Trust Company from 1907 to 1917, when it was merged with Bankers Trust.

Converse served as Chairman of the International Nickel Company from 1916 until his death in 1921.

== Baseball ==
After the Pittsburgh Alleghenys baseball team in the American Association experienced a very poor season in 1883, they elected Converse, a substantial shareholder in the club, as team president. The team got worse in 1884, but after that season Converse found out that the Columbus Buckeyes were disbanding and sent manager Horace Phillips to Columbus to recruit the players. Phillips enlisted almost all of them, poising the Alleghenys for significant improvement. Converse did not reach a second season as president, though, as William A. Nimick took over the position.

== Personal life ==
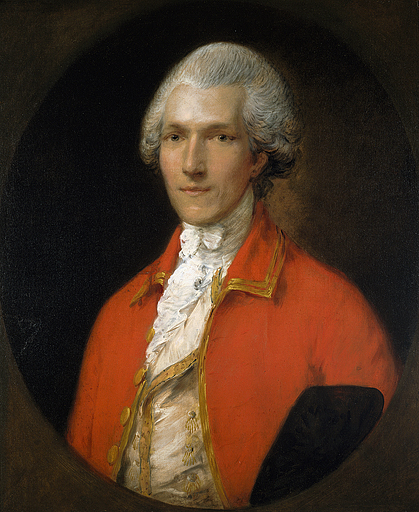
Portrait of Benjamin Thompson given to Harvard University by the bequest of Converse

Converse engaged in philanthropic activities. In 1912, Converse financed the first endowed chair at the Harvard Business School. Four years later, he donated $250,000 to establish a library at Amherst College, the alma mater of his brother James. The Converse Library was dedicated in November 1917.

In 1879, Converse was married to Jessie MacDonough Green. She died in 1912, several months after undergoing an operation for appendicitis. Two years later, the 64-year-old Converse married Mary Edith Dunshee, who was 48. Dunshee was the sister of Converse's brother's widow.

Converse's son, Edmund, Jr., owned the Rancho Santa Paula y Saticoy in Ventura County, California. A daughter, Antoinette, moved to Germany after marrying Baron von Romberg, who died in World War I. Another daughter, Katherine, married one of her father's protégés, Benjamin Strong, Jr.; Strong was a president of Bankers Trust and governor of the Federal Reserve Bank of New York.

== Death ==
Converse died at the Huntington Hotel of heart problems in 1921. Local press coverage after his death included the unsubstantiated assertion that Converse may have been murdered. Upon his death, his estate was valued at US$21,000,000 ($379,057,836 today), most of which was willed to colleges, charities and family members. Among the willed items was a portrait of Benjamin Thompson, which was thought to be worth $75,000 in 1912; it was bequeathed to Harvard University.
