= Thomas Cochran (banker) =

American banker (1871–1936)

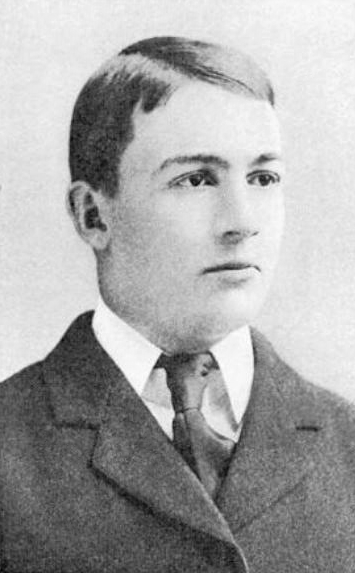
- Born: March 20, 1871; Saint Paul, Minnesota, U.S.
- Died: October 29, 1936 (aged 65); Bedford, New York, U.S.
- Education: Phillips Academy; Yale University
- Occupation: Banker
- Employer(s): Astor Trust Company; Liberty National Bank of New York; J.P. Morgan & Co.
- Known for: Addison Gallery of American Art
- Spouse: Martha (Andrews) Cochran
- Parent(s): Thomas Cochran; Emilie Belden (Walsh) Cochran

Thomas Cochran (March 20, 1871 – October 29, 1936) was an American banker and college football player and coach. He served as the head football coach at the University of Minnesota for the 1894 Golden Gophers season, leading the team to a 3–1 record. He was the second Yale University graduate to coach at Minnesota, following his predecessor, Wallace Winter. The Minnesota football program was suffering financially, so Cochran delivered lectures titled "Football as Played in the East" at locations around the nation to help raise money.

== Life and career ==
Born in Saint Paul, Minnesota, on March 20, 1871, Cochran was the son of a lawyer and real-estate broker in New York and Saint Paul. He was educated at Phillips Academy Andover and at Yale University, where he was an editor of campus humor magazine The Yale Record and a member of the Skull and Bones society.

Cochran was the vice-president of the Astor Trust Company from 1906 to 1914, and president of the Liberty National Bank of New York from 1914 to 1916. He became a partner in J.P. Morgan & Co. in 1917. In the late 1920s and early 1930s, Cochran funded the creation of several buildings on the Phillips Academy campus, notably the Addison Gallery of American Art.

Cochran died of a heart attack, October 29, 1936, at his home in Bedford, New York.

== Head coaching record ==
Year	Team	Overall	Conference	Standing	Bowl/playoffs
Minnesota Golden Gophers (Independent) (1894)
1894	Minnesota	3–1			
Minnesota:		3–1			
Total:		3–1			
