= Charles S. Sanford Jr. =

American businessman

Charles Steadman "Charlie" Sanford (died September 4, 2018) was an American businessman who served as chairman of the board and chief executive officer of Bankers Trust.

After graduating from the University of Georgia in 1958, where he was a member of the Gridiron Secret Society, Sanford served as a United States Army lieutenant. Sanford then returned to school and obtained an MBA from the Wharton School of the University of Pennsylvania in 1960.

Sanford's career at Bankers Trust began in 1961 as a commercial banking officer, and he was promoted through the ranks culminating in the positions of chairman and chief executive officer in 1987. Sanford retired from the company in 1996.

Sanford is credited with implementing the first value at risk (VaR) model. Prior to Sanford's quantitative measurement, credit and market risk was defined through ad hoc measures.

Sanford died September 4, 2018, at Oak Hammock at the University of Florida in Gainesville, Florida.
