= Con Edison Energy Museum =

Defunct museum in Manhattan, New York

The Con Edison Energy Museum was a museum located at 145 East 14th Street in Manhattan in the Consolidated Edison Building. It told the history of the company and displayed a series of exhibits related to Thomas Edison and the early years of electricity including a miniature version of the Pearl Street Station and a potential for the future.

The museum is believed to have been established in August 1979.
