= Alison Elizabeth Taylor =

American artist (born 1972)

Alison Elizabeth Taylor (born 1972) is an American artist based out of New York City. She is known for her marquetry hybrid work combining Renaissance-style marquetry with painting and collage to depict contemporary subject matter. Her exhibitions have been covered in The New York Times, The New Yorker, and The Village Voice.

== Works and career ==
Taylor creates images using marquetry which she has expanded to include painting and photographs.

She subverts Inlay's decorative status by constructing narratives that are neither decorative nor memorial, nor facile, but rather freezing the abject, mundane, and ordinary in time. Marquetry was first popularized under Louis XIV in the 17th century in the unprecedented luxury of Versailles. By portraying these subjects in a technique associated with opulence and privilege, the artist pays respect to the subject and challenges the expectations and connotations associated with the material.

Taylor won the Outwin Boochever Portrait Competition for her work Anthony Cuts under the Williamsburg Bridge, Morning, which is subsequently on display at the Smithsonian's National Portrait Gallery. As a result of her win, Taylor will be commissioned to portray a remarkable living American for the National Portrait Gallery’s collection.

From February 18 to July 30, 2023, the Addison Gallery of American Art exhibited Alison Elizabeth Taylor: The Sum of It, an exhibit of approximately 40 large-scale single panels that traced “the evolution of the artist’s work.”

Alison Elizabeth Taylor is a graduate of Columbia University, School of the Arts.
