= Bankers Trust =

Defunct American bank

- Logo in use prior to its 1997 acquisition of Alex. Brown & Sons
- Industry: Trust company
- Founded: 1903; 123 years ago
- Fate: Merged with Alex. Brown & Sons
- Successor: Deutsche Bank
- Headquarters: New York City
- Products: Financial services

Bankers Trust was a historic American banking organization. The bank merged with Alex. Brown & Sons in 1997 before being acquired by Deutsche Bank in 1999. Deutsche Bank sold the Trust and Custody division of Bankers Trust to State Street Corporation in 2003.

== History ==
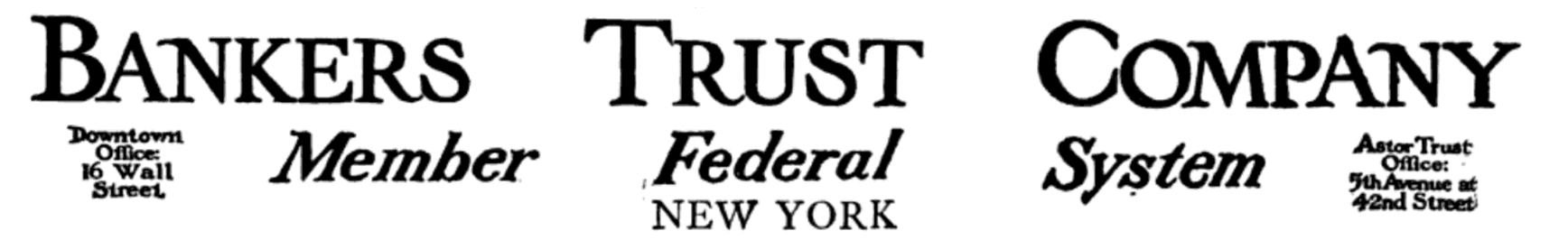
Bankers Trust logo c. 1919

In 1903 a group of New York national banks formed the trust company Bankers Trust to provide trust services to customers of state and national banks throughout the country on the premise that it would not lure commercial bank customers away. In addition to offering the usual trust and commercial banking functions, it also acted as a "bankers' bank" by holding the reserves of other banks and trust companies and loaning them money when they needed additional reserves due to unexpected withdrawals. Bankers Trust Company was incorporated on March 24, 1903, with an initial capital of $1.5 million. Despite technically having numerous stockholders, the voting power was held by three associates of J. P. Morgan. These circumstances led to a widespread perception of it as a Morgan company. Morgan himself held a controlling interest, and Edmund C. Converse, a steel manufacturer turned financier and then president of Liberty National Bank, was chosen to serve as Bankers Trust's first president.

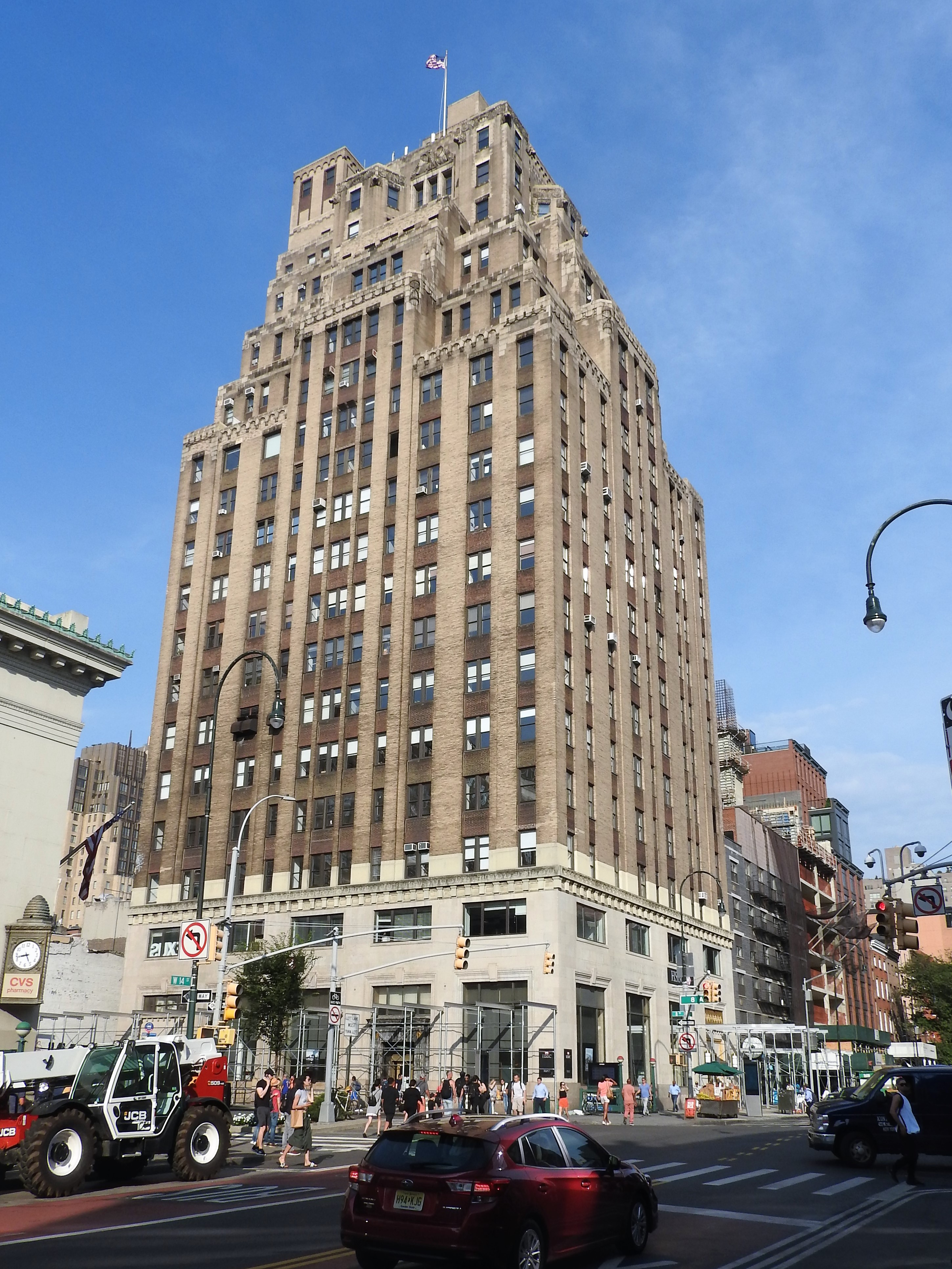
80 8th Avenue, the 1930 Bankers Trust Building

Bankers Trust quickly grew to be the second-largest U.S. trust company and a dominant Wall Street institution. During the Panic of 1907, Bankers Trust worked closely with J.P. Morgan to help avoid a general financial collapse by lending money to sound banks. In 1911, it acquired the Mercantile Company and, a year later, the Manhattan Trust Company. In 1914 Converse resigned to become president of Astor Trust Company, another Morgan company. He was succeeded by his son-in-law Benjamin Strong Jr. Strong served as president for less than a year, leaving Bankers Trust to become the first governor of the Federal Reserve Bank of New York after helping to establish the Federal Reserve System. Strong was succeeded by Seward Prosser, who became the third president of Bankers Trust. By 1915, Bankers Trust was doing approximately $30,000,000,000 of business, consisting solely of business from companies, and no safes or other deposits were from the general public. In 1916, it completed alterations to the Bankers Trust Building, its offices at the corner of Wall and Nassau Streets that it had built 4 years earlier.

Under Prosser's leadership, Bankers Trust merged with the Astor Trust Company on April 23, 1917. The merger had been rumored for some time, as both banks had a number of directors in common; Prosser was president of the Bankers and a director of the Astor, and Edmund C. Converse was president of the Astor and a director of the Bankers. The Astor continued "with no change in management, as the uptown branch of the Bankers Trust Company." The new company had capital of $11,250,000, "undivided profit of more than $5,000,000, and deposits of about $300,000,000." In October 1917, the company became a member of the Federal Reserve system.

Prosser served as president of the merged entity until 1923, at which point he was elected chairman of the board and succeeded by Albert Arthur Tilney. Prosser served as chairman until his death in 1942. Tilney's presidency was short-lived, however, as Henry Cochran, who had been a vice president at the company for twelve years, was elected as the fifth president in 1929. Upon Cochran's elevation to the presidency, Tilney assumed the newly created position of vice chairman of the board of directors. Cochran served as president until 1931, when S. Sloan Colt was elected the sixth president and Cochran became vice chairman of the board. In 1956, Alex H. Ardrey became president of Bankers Trust. Ardrey joined the bank in 1930 as a vice president and was elected executive vice president in 1948. In 1957, 42-year-old William Moore, an executive vice president and director, became chairman and chief executive officer of the Bankers Trust Company, succeeding Colt, who had become chairman in 1956, when Ardrey became president.

In 1960, Wallis B. Dunckel, a senior vice president who had been with the bank since 1923, was elected president of Bankers Trust to succeed Ardrey, who was elected vice chairman. In 1966, Alfred Brittain III, then head of the foreign department, was elected president of Bankers Trust to succeed Dunckel, who retired. In 1966, Bankers Trust acquired a one-third interest in an Antwerp banking company, Banque G.&C. Kreglinger, S.A., which was renamed Banque de Benelux after the transaction. The other two-thirds partners were Plouvier et Cie., S.A., a Belgian group composed of the former Kreglinger owners, and L'Union des Mines-La Henin, a French investment and holding company in which Bankers Trust had an equity interest.

=== 1980s and early 1990s ===
In 1980, Bankers Trust exited retail banking under the direction of Brittain. The bank attempted to sell its credit portfolio and branches to Bank of Montreal; however, the deal was not completed due to a disagreement over BankAmericard (known today as Visa). Bank of Montreal wanted to include BankAmericard in the terms of sale, but Bankers Trust did not want to sell the new credit card program licensed from Bank of America due to its profitable future. Eventually, Bankers Trust sold 89 branches to five banks, including Republic National Bank of New York. Republic National Bank of New York expanded its branch network to 32 with the opening of a new branch in Manhattan's World Trade Center and the acquisition of a dozen Bankers Trust Company branches—ten in Manhattan, one in the Bronx, and one in Brooklyn.

Bankers Trust became a leader in the nascent derivatives business under the management of Charlie Sanford, who succeeded Alfred Brittain III, in the early 1990s. Having de-emphasized traditional loans in favor of trading, the bank became an acknowledged leader in risk management. Lacking the boardroom contacts of its larger rivals, notably J. P. Morgan, BT attempted to make a virtue of necessity by specializing in trading and in product innovation.

The company shied away from using market data distribution products from companies such as Reuters, instead choosing to develop its own systems in-house. A small development team based in London created BIDDS (Broadgate Information Data Distribution System), which included the Montage front-end package that traders used to obtain data from data feeds and broker screens.

In early 1994, despite all its prowess in managing the risks in the trading room, the bank suffered irreparable reputational damage when some complex derivative transactions caused large losses for major corporate clients. Two of these—Gibson Greetings and Procter & Gamble (P&G)—successfully sued BT, asserting that they had not been informed of, or (in the latter case) had been unable to understand, the risks involved. In 1995, the Securities and Exchange Commission sanctioned Gibson Greetings for its handling of derivatives trading, and Bankers Trust settled the P&G case in May 1996.

=== 1997 merger and 1998 sale ===
BT Alex. Brown logo in use between 1997 and 1999 following its acquisition of Alex. Brown & Sons

In 1997, Bankers Trust acquired Alex. Brown & Sons, founded in 1800 and a public corporation since 1986, in an attempt to grow its investment banking business.

The bank suffered major losses during the 1998 Russian financial crisis since the bank had a large position in Russian government bonds.

In late 1998, shortly before Bankers Trust was acquired by Deutsche Bank, BT pleaded guilty to institutional fraud due to the failure of certain members of senior management to escheat abandoned property to the State of New York and other states. Rather than turn over to the states' funds from dormant customer accounts and uncashed dividend and interest checks as required by law, some of the bank's senior executives credited this money as income and moved it to its operating account.

Bruce J. Kingdon, the head of the bank's Corporate Trust and Agency group, spearheaded the fraud and (in 2001) entered into a guilty plea in the US District Court for the Southern District of New York and was sentenced to community service. The SEC subsequently barred some of his subordinates from working in the securities markets permanently.

With the bank's guilty plea in the escheatment lawsuit and thereafter its status as a convicted felon, it became ineligible to transact business with most municipalities and many companies, which are prohibited from transacting business with felons. Consequently, the acquisition by Deutsche Bank significantly benefited the bank's shareholders, shielding them from losing their entire investment.

In November 1998, Deutsche Bank agreed to purchase Bankers Trust for $10.1 billion; the purchase was finalized on June 4, 1999. At the time, Deutsche Bank owned a 12% stake in DaimlerChrysler but United States banking laws prohibit banks from owning industrial companies, so Deutsche Bank received an exception to this prohibition through 1978 legislation from Congress. CEO Frank N. Newman received $55 million in severance. He had led the Bankers Trust acquisition of Alex. Brown & Sons and ensured that the bank would hold a large position in Russian government bonds.

On June 4, 1999, Deutsche Bank merged its Bankers Trust and Deutsche Morgan Grenfell to become Deutsche Asset Management (DAM) with Robert Smith as the CEO.

=== Later sales ===
In 1999, Deutsche Bank sold the Bankers Trust Australian division to the Principal Financial Group, who, in turn, sold the investment banking business to Macquarie Group in June 1999 and the asset management division to Westpac on October 31, 2002. This organisation now uses the name BT Financial Group.

Deutsche Bank announced on November 5, 2002, that it would sell the Trust and Custody division of Bankers Trust to State Street Corporation. The sale finalized in February 2003.

== Controversies ==
In 1995, litigation by two major corporate clients against Bankers Trust shed light on the market for over-the-counter derivatives. Bankers Trust employees were found to have repeatedly provided customers with incorrect valuations of their derivative exposures. The head of the US Commodity Futures Trading Commission (CFTC) during this time was later interviewed by Frontline in October 2009: "The only way the CFTC found out about the Bankers Trust fraud was because Procter & Gamble, and others, filed suit. There was no record-keeping requirement imposed on participants in the market. There was no reporting. We had no information." -Brooksley Born, US CFTC Chair, 1996-'99.

Several Bankers Trust brokers were caught on tape remarking that their client [Gibson Greetings and P&G, respectively] would not be able to understand what they were doing in reference to derivative contracts sold in 1993. As part of their legal case against Bankers Trust, Procter & Gamble (P&G) "discovered secret telephone recordings between brokers at Bankers Trust, where 'one employee described the business as 'a wet dream,' ... another Bankers Trust employee said, '...we set 'em up.'" The bank's row with P&G made the front page of major US magazines during 1995. On October 16, 1995, the US magazine BusinessWeek published a cover story that P&G was pursuing racketeering charges against Bankers Trust: "The key evidence: some 6,500 tape recordings."

Both the magnitude of losses and the litigation by well-known companies caused market regulators to intervene. Concerns motivated by the particular Bankers Trust case eventually extended to the OTC derivatives market in general. The US CFTC embarked on a failed attempt to take over part of the bank regulators' role in regulating the OTC derivatives market in the late 1990s. The thesis of an October 20, 2009, broadcast of the PBS television magazine Frontline, Early Warnings of the Economic Meltdown, was that the failure of Congress to allow CFTC a role in regulating derivatives was a key element eventually leading to the 2008 financial crisis.

== Notable former employees ==
=== Business ===
- Mary Vail Andress—first woman executive at a major New York bank (1924)
- Jeff Bezos—chief executive officer of Amazon
- Greg Coffey—hedge fund manager
- Chris Corrigan—private investor and former CEO of Patrick Corporation
- Henry P. Davison—banker
- Brady Dougan—chief executive officer of Credit Suisse
- Richard Farleigh—private investor
- John Key—former New Zealand Prime Minister and investment banker
- Jack Langer (born 1948/1949) - basketball player and investment banker
- Jerome Powell—former Chair of the Federal Reserve of the United States
- Herbert L. Pratt—director of BT from 1917 to 1938 and head of Standard Oil Company of New York
- Sally Shelton-Colby—banker and diplomat
- Benjamin Strong, Jr.—Secretary (1904–09), Vice-President (1909–13), President (1913–14), then first head of New York Federal Reserve (1914–28)
- Nassim Taleb—author and financial mathematician
- Albert H. Wiggin—president of Chase National Bank
- Robert G. Wilmers—Chief Executive Officer and Chairman of M&T Bank

=== Other ===
- Maxim Dlugy—chess International Grandmaster
- Jack H. Jacobs—Medal of Honor recipient
- Charlie Rose—television reporter
