= Consolidated Edison Building =

Office skyscraper in Manhattan, New York

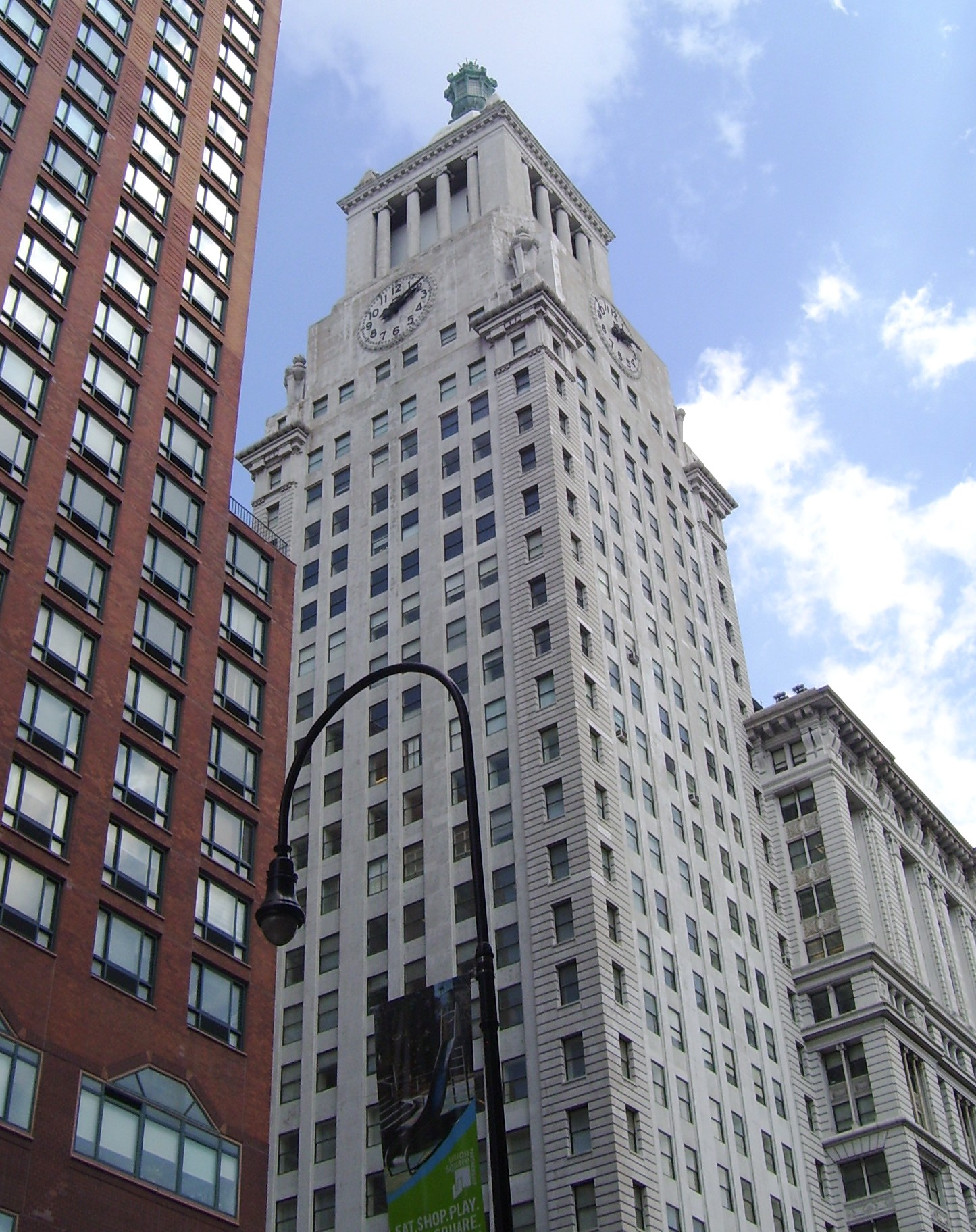
- Interactive map of the Consolidated Edison Building area

General information
- Type: Commercial offices
- Architectural style: Beaux-Arts; Neoclassical
- Location: 4 Irving Place; Manhattan, New York, US
- Coordinates: 40°44′03″N 73°59′16″W
- Construction started: 1911
- Completed: 1929
- Owner: Consolidated Edison

Height
- Architectural: 478 ft (146 m)

Technical details
- Floor count: 26

Design and construction
- Architects: Henry Hardenbergh (original structure); Warren and Wetmore (annex)
- Structural engineer: Thomas E. Murray
- Main contractor: George A. Fuller Company (original structure)

New York City Landmark
- Designated: February 10, 2009
- Reference no.: 2313

The Consolidated Edison Building (also known as the Consolidated Gas Building and 4 Irving Place) is a neoclassical skyscraper in the Gramercy neighborhood of Manhattan in New York City, United States. The 26-story (Note: The building is generally cited as being 26 stories high. Christopher Gray of The New York Times describes the Consolidated Edison Building as being 24 stories, while Richard Berenholtz cites the structure as rising 23 stories.) building was designed by the architectural firms of Warren and Wetmore and Henry Janeway Hardenbergh. The building takes up the western two-thirds of the block bounded by 14th Street to the south, Irving Place to the west, 15th Street to the north, and Third Avenue to the east. It serves as the headquarters of energy company Consolidated Edison, also known as Con Ed.

The site formerly contained Tammany Hall and the original Academy of Music (1854–1926), as well as the offices of Con Ed's predecessor, Consolidated Gas. The gas company was originally headquartered at 15th Street and Irving Place, but had outgrown its original building by the 1910s. As a result, Hardenbergh designed an expansion for the existing headquarters, which was constructed from 1911 to 1914. This expansion was later incorporated into a larger structure built by Warren and Wetmore between 1926 and 1929. Upon completion, the building's design was lauded by local media, and its "Tower of Light" became a symbol of the local skyline. In 2009, the building was declared a New York City designated landmark.

== Site ==
The Consolidated Edison Building is in the Gramercy neighborhood of Manhattan in New York City, near Union Square. The land lot spans the entirety of a rectangular city block bounded by Irving Place to the west, 15th Street to the north, Third Avenue to the east, and 14th Street to the south. The site covers 93,778 square feet (8,712.3 m^{2}), measuring 420 feet (130 m) wide along 14th and 15th Streets and 206.5 feet (62.9 m) wide along Irving Place and Third Avenue. The building is officially located at 4 Irving Place, though the building also takes up the lots between 2 and 10 Irving Place. It is near Zeckendorf Towers to the west, Irving Plaza and the Daryl Roth Theatre to the northwest, and Christ Church Lutheran to the north.

The site was originally occupied by the Lenape Native Americans until 1651, when a large tract from Bowery (now Fourth Avenue) to the East River between 3rd and 30th Streets was given to New Netherland director-general Peter Stuyvesant. While the Stuyvesant family retained much of their land through the 18th century, some 33 acres (13 ha) of the Stuyvesant estate were bought in 1748 by Cornelius Tiebout, whose widow later passed ownership of the land to her son, Cornelius T. Williams. The current building's site includes land from Stuyvesant, Williams, and auctioneer David Dunham. When the Manhattan street grid was laid out with the Commissioners' Plan of 1811, space was provided for what would become Union Square, one block west of the present-day Consolidated Edison Building, which opened in 1839. To the east of the square, between Fourth and Third Avenues, a community of rowhouses as well as a north–south street called Irving Place were developed by Samuel B. Ruggles.

The block now occupied by the Consolidated Edison Building was originally occupied by buildings of various uses, including rowhouses on 15th Street, the Fifteenth Street Presbyterian Church, and the New York University School of Medicine on 14th Street. The Manhattan Gas Light Company purchased land at the southeast corner of 15th Street and Irving Place in 1855, where it erected a Renaissance Revival office structure. Just south of the Gas Light Company's office was the Academy of Music, New York's third opera house, which opened in 1854. The structure burned down in 1866, destroying the blockfront on 14th Street between Third Avenue and Irving Place. The Academy of Music was rebuilt and continued to serve as an opera site until 1887, when it was turned into a movie theater. The Tammany Hall political organization purchased the former medical school site and built its headquarters building there. Another building on the present Consolidated Edison Building's site, a mansion at 2 Irving Place, served as headquarters for the Lotos Club.

== History ==
In the 1880s, at a time when competition between New York City's gas companies was high, the Manhattan Gas Light Company and several other gas companies combined to become the Consolidated Gas Company. By 1910, the original offices at 15th Street proved to be insufficient for the company's operations, and it had opened offices in several other buildings on the block, including the old Lotos Club house.

=== Construction ===
Consolidated Gas hired Henry Janeway Hardenbergh to design a 12-story office building on that site in late 1911. The building was to be erected in two phases to avoid interrupting the company's operations. The architect had previously constructed a showroom for the company. The site had a frontage of 84 feet (26 m) on Irving Place and 155.6 feet (47.4 m) on 15th Street. Plans for a 12-story structure on that site were filed with the Manhattan Bureau of Buildings in December 1910, and the George A. Fuller Company was hired as the general contractor. The first phase of construction, between January and September 1911, entailed erecting a 62-foot-wide (19 m) edifice on the center of the block at 124–128 East 15th Street. By that October, Consolidated Gas had begun relocating its offices into the annex. Consolidated Gas president George B. Cortelyou was the last employee to relocate to the new building, doing so in December 1911.

The original headquarters and the Lotos Club house were originally retained as offices, but this soon proved insufficient. By December 1911, Consolidated Gas had modified its plans and wished to replace the old structures. The company wanted to erect a new building with 19 stories, including a penthouse. Consolidated Gas bought additional property to the east in June 1912; the purchase was finalized that November, giving the company a lot measuring nearly 300 feet (91 m) wide. The day after the sale was finalized, Hardenbergh filed plans for an addition to the building, costing $1.5 million. The relatively new headquarters at 124–128 East 15th Street had not been intended to support additional stories, as Consolidated Gas had erroneously assumed that the structure would be sufficient for the company's needs. As such, a 19-story wing was built on either side of the existing 12-story structure, and seven additional stories were suspended from girders above the existing structure. The first of these girders was installed in August 1913.

The building, which ultimately cost $2.5 million, housed 2,000 Consolidated Gas employees across five departments. After the 19-story building was finished in 1914, Consolidated Gas rented out some of the additional space in the building; at the time, the company did not need to use the entire floor area. Among the tenants were the Dahlstrom Metallic Door Company, which had manufactured the building's doors, partitions and trim. A two-story building at 144 East 15th Street was added in 1915 and was used for showrooms. This showroom measured 22 by 84 feet (6.7 by 25.6 m) and was made of brick and steel.

=== Expansion ===
By the 1920s, Consolidated Gas had expanded into the outer boroughs, and there was need for even more office space. In August 1925, the company purchased the Academy of Music, which hosted its last show in May 1926. Consolidated Gas hired Warren and Wetmore, which had previously designed some of the company's branch offices as architects. T.E. Murray, Inc., which built boiler plants and power-generating stations, were the general contractors. Blueprints for a 26-story annex, plus alterations to the existing building, were submitted to the New York City Department of Buildings in October 1926. (Note: The New York Herald Tribune incorrectly reported Thomas E. Murray Inc. as the architects.) A set of bells, measuring about 2.5 short tons (2.2 long tons; 2.3 t), was hoisted to the top of the Consolidated Edison Building's clock tower in December 1927. A massive telephone switchboard at the building was dedicated in April 1928, and the 20-story wing was completed that November.

The Tammany Hall building on 14th Street was sold to Joseph P. Day and J. Clarence Davis, of real estate syndicate D&D Company, in December 1927. The society planned to relocate to the nearby 44 Union Square East, which was then under construction. D&D sold the Tammany building again to Consolidated Gas in January 1928. There were allegations that Tammany leaders profited from the sales, which Tammany leader George Washington Olvany denied. Day, a long-time member of Tammany Hall, eventually agreed to give the $70,000 profit from the sale to Tammany. Tammany Hall remained in its old headquarters until July 4, 1928, so it could celebrate the U.S. Independence Day at that location. Immediately afterward, it moved to a temporary space at 2 Park Avenue.

Plans for an annex were submitted to the Department of Buildings in September 1928. The next month, Consolidated Gas bought two houses on Third Avenue, giving the new building an exit on that avenue. After Consolidated Gas acquired the Brooklyn Edison Company in 1928, employees of the Edison Company began relocating to the Consolidated Gas Building in May 1929. The top of the building's tower was first illuminated on July 4, 1929, and the annex was finished by that November. After the completion of this expansion, the building contained 1 million square feet (93,000 m^{2}) of floor area, used by 7,000 employees.

=== Later usage ===
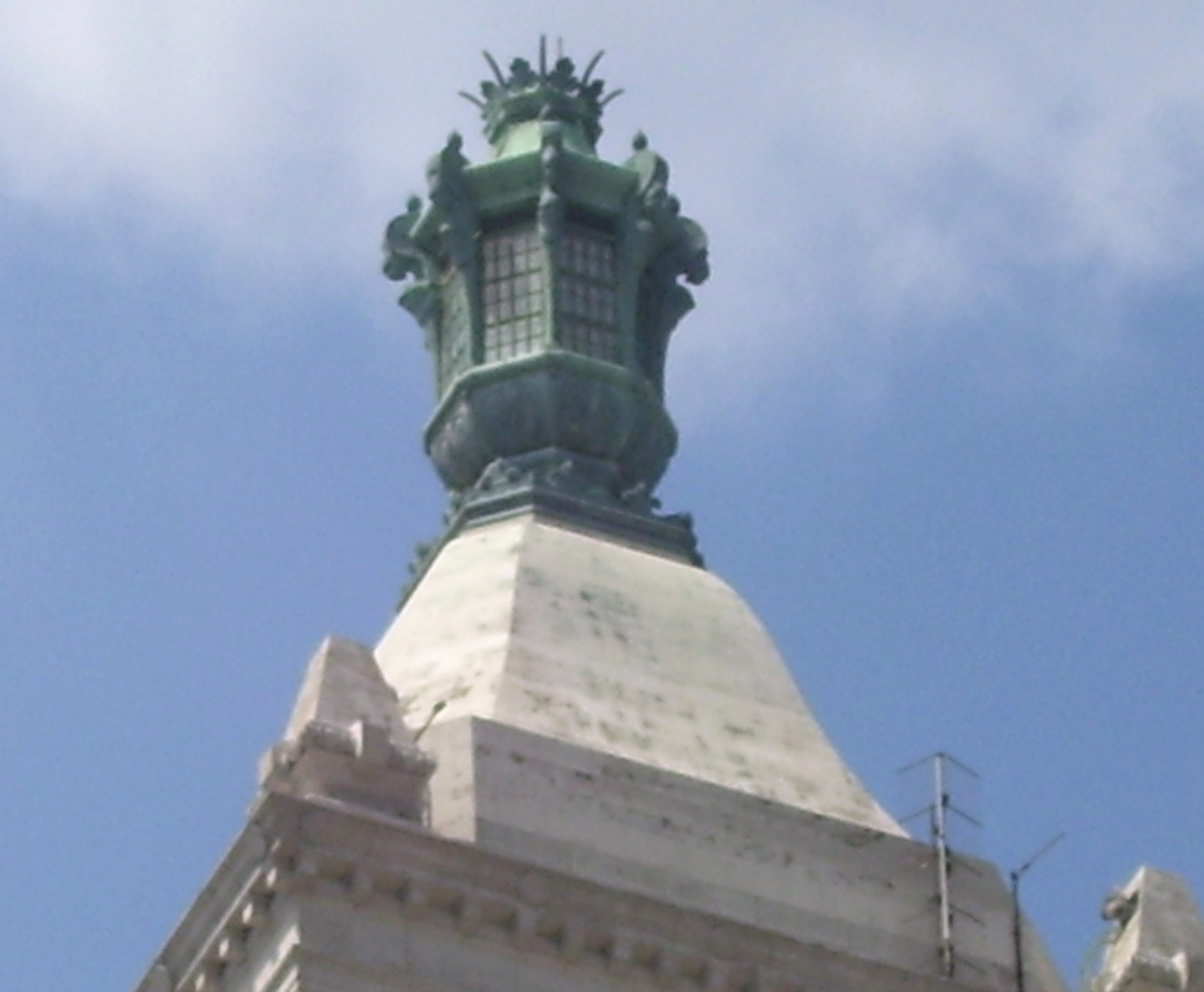
The "Tower of Light" at the top of the building's tower, seen from Third Avenue

The ground floor space was rented out to various tenants, including First National City Bank (now Citibank), which opened a bank branch there in 1928. A 1932 guidebook stated that Consolidated Gas had become the "largest company in the world providing electrical service". Consolidated Gas was incorporated as the Consolidated Edison Company of New York in 1936, and its headquarters were renamed accordingly. The 15th Street facade was reconfigured in 1954, and various components have been replaced and installed over the years.

In 1965–1966, the facade was repainted with about 2,000 U.S. gallons (7,600 L) of paint and given an acrylic emulsion. By the 1970s, the headquarters had 6,000 employees. Con Ed continued to expand into adjacent states, though it still retains its headquarters at Gramercy Park. In 1975, the Fuerzas Armadas de Liberación Nacional Puertorriqueña, a Puerto Rican nationalist group, claimed responsibility for a bombing that caused minor damage to the building, but injured no one. The group also claimed responsibility for a similar bombing at the same site in 1978, which also caused little damage. The Con Edison Energy Museum existed in the building in the late 20th century.

The light bulbs on the tower's clock were replaced in 1994. The tower and facade were repaired once again from 1997 to 2001, and the light bulbs on the facade were replaced in 2008. In 2010, it was officially designated a city landmark by the New York City Landmarks Preservation Commission. By then, the space was occupied by such tenants as the New York Sports Club, the Apple Bank for Savings, and a Raymour & Flanigan furniture store.

== Architecture ==
The height of the roof is 404 feet (123 m) while the height to the tip of the lantern is 478 feet (146 m). For the structure, the architects worked out a limestone form with its corners clad in mock quoining. Courses of stone were raised to create a column of protruding blocks. Few alterations have been made to the facade since the 1920s expansions.

=== Form and facade ===
==== Hardenbergh structure ====
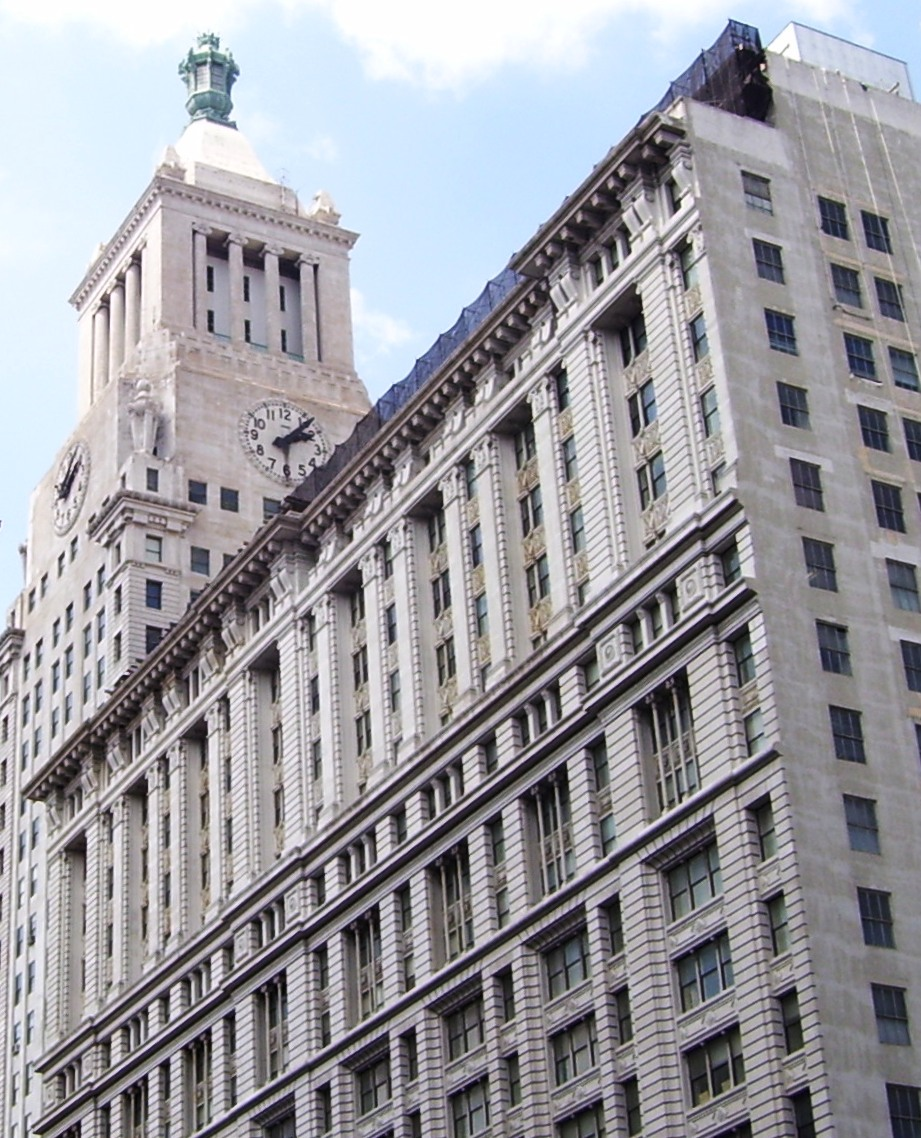
The Hardenbergh structure, seen from Third Avenue to the east. The top six floors were added after construction. There are cornices above the 10th, 12th, 13th, and 17th floors, and a crowning cornice above the 18th floor. A penthouse can be seen on the 19th floor and is set back from the main facade

The initial structure by Hardenbergh was one of the architect's last designs. The original plans called for a 12-story building with a facade made of limestone. In the original plans, the lowest three levels were to contain storefronts, with double-height segmental arches along the facade of the ground and second floors. On the middle seven levels, the windows were to be recessed into vertical bays, with each bay containing three windows on each floor. The top two levels were to contain windows that were recessed into the facade, separated by colonettes in the Ionic order, as well as decorated spandrels within the windows.

Hardenbergh's original plan called for the main entrance to be on 15th Street; the entrance would have contained marble arches with backlit panels. When the expanded building design was implemented, the main entrance was moved to Irving Place while the secondary entrance was moved to 15th Street. The Irving Place entrance was given a recessed portico supported by Ionic columns, while the 15th Street entrance was simpler in design. The original 12 stories remained mostly the same, but the 13th story of the building was distinguished by a "transitional" design with small cornices below and above that floor. The 14th through 17th floors contained piers between each recessed bay, which were supported by Ionic pilasters, while a projecting cornice was placed on the 18th floor. Elements of several architectural styles were used, including the Beaux-Arts base, Baroque midsection, and the Renaissance Revival and neoclassical decorations on top.

Illumination of the facade was a key part of the Hardenbergh design for the building: lamps were suspended beneath the cornice and on the roofline, and the storefronts at ground level were also illuminated. Even the use of limestone on the facade, instead of brick, was conducive to the illumination, as the limestone reflected the light generated by these lamps. The Real Estate Record & Guide cited the building's exterior illumination scheme as being "as interesting an example of decorative exterior lighting as has ever been attempted in New York City." Such illumination had been used previously in the city, notably at Luna Park and Dreamland amusement parks at Coney Island, as well as during the 1909 Hudson Fulton Celebration, when illumination was placed on the East River bridges and on major structures such as the Singer Building and the Plaza Hotel. However, it was still relatively rare for office buildings to be illuminated each night, though such lighting schemes were commonly tested at the premises of power companies. The lighting scheme was scrapped in the 1920s when the Warren and Wetmore tower was built.

==== Warren and Wetmore structure ====
The design of the 26-story tower at Irving Place and 14th Street was similar to the Metropolitan Life Insurance Company Tower at Madison Avenue and 23rd Street. Two 18-story wings wrapping the tower were designed in a similar manner to Hardenbergh's structure. The decoration was similar to that of Hardenbergh's design, but with less detail. The base contained a three-story colonnade with Doric columns. Throughout the Warren and Wetmore section of the building, there is light-inspired ornamentation including depictions of urns, torches, lamps, thunderbolts, and suns. These decorations symbolize Con Ed's function as a power company, and by extension, a provider of light.

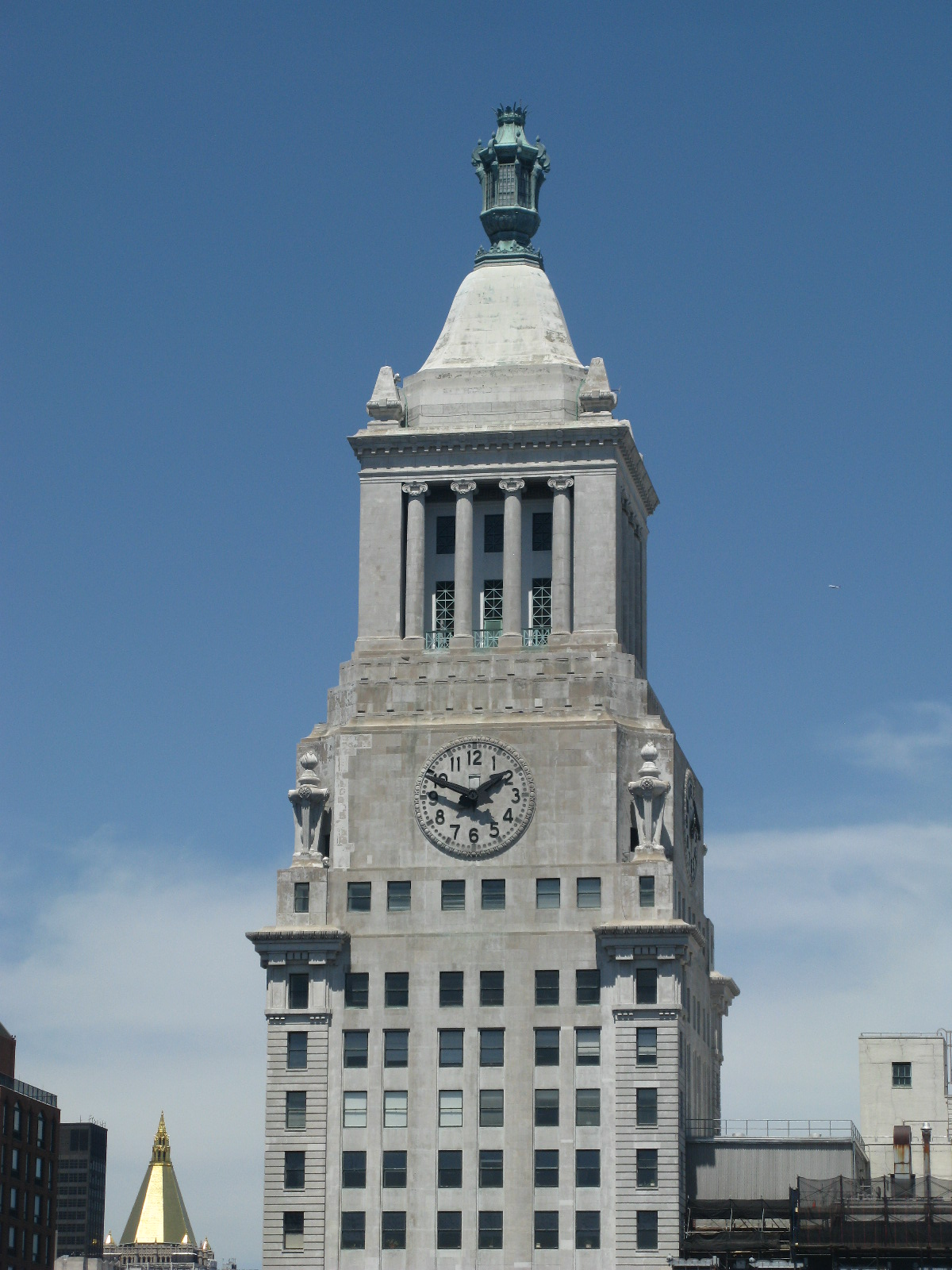
Tower

Rising above the base was a tower that was set back from the street, as required by the 1916 Zoning Resolution. The ornamentation at the tower's peak included urns and obelisks, which were normally associated with funereal aspects, and was modeled after the Mausoleum at Halicarnassus. These decorations memorialize Con Ed workers killed in World War I. The tower section was topped by a "Tower of Light" designed to look like a miniature temple. Just below the pinnacle is a recessed loggia of columns, which are illuminated in various colors at night. Under the columns, the tower includes four 16-foot wide clock faces, one on each side of the building. The tower also contains a set of bells, which strike every quarter-hour and are synchronized with a clock in Washington, D.C. Measuring 400 feet (120 m) high, the bells were the second-highest in the world at the time of their installation, behind those of the Metropolitan Life Insurance Company Tower.

The tower is capped by a bronze lantern which lights up at night; the lantern measures 8 feet (2.4 m) high. The lighting scheme on the tower was first activated in 1929. At the time, the lighting scheme was unusual in that it provided colored light, as opposed to the plain colors expressed by most other buildings' illuminations, and also was powered by electricity rather than gas. When the tower was completed, light beams radiated to the north, west, south, and east, as well as upward. The lights cycled through 21 colors within three minutes

=== Features ===
When completed in 1914, the original Consolidated Gas Building contained a large auditorium, in addition to a restaurant on the 19th floor. By 1928, Consolidated Gas purported to have the world's largest privately owned telephone switchboard, with 60,000 jacks maintained by 75 operators. The building also contains a 6,500-square-foot (600 m^{2}) private library for Con Edison, which has existed at the same site since 1906 and had 35,000 books and 380 periodicals by the 1980s.

Although the western and eastern sections of the building on 15th Street were built as 19-story structures, the center portion was originally only 12 stories high and could not support the weight of seven extra stories. As such, the 13th through 19th stories are suspended above the center portion of the building via a system of trusses. Above the 19th story of the center section are eight girders, each weighing 27 to 46 short tons (24 to 41 long tons; 24 to 42 t). The girders themselves are anchored to two-story-high steel frames above the western and eastern sections of the building; each steel frame consists of eight columns that rise straight from the building's foundation. According to The Washington Post, this effectively created a seven-story building hanging 200 feet above street level.

== Critical reception ==
Robert A. M. Stern wrote in 1983 that Hardenbergh's blending of styles for the original building—as used on another of his commissions, the Plaza Hotel near Central Park—demonstrated a "masterful combination of gemuetlichkeit and Classical rigor".

The addition was widely lauded for its features. A critic in The New Yorker wrote in 1929 that the addition, "interestingly wedged in between the flanking buildings", included "a sturdy shaft, classic in detail and vigorous in silhouette". The New Yorker writer further explained that the building was well integrated into the features of the neighboring structures and employed a good use of setbacks, but that the cornice above the base was slightly offset. Another magazine, The Architect, stated that the design and decorations "made this a building of unusual merit and distinction", while W. Parker Chase wrote in 1933 that the Consolidated Edison Building was among the city's most "beautiful and magnificent structures". The lighting scheme was also praised. In the 1939 WPA Guide to New York City, workers for the Federal Writers' Project called the lighting scheme one of the city's "welcome landmarks", while in 1981, The New York Times described the Tower of Light as one of the "crowns of light" decorating the Manhattan skyline.

== See also ==
- List of New York City Designated Landmarks in Manhattan below 14th Street
