= Alexander Lafayette Chew =

American businessman (1824–1911)

Alexander Lafayette Chew (October 4, 1824 – November 19, 1911) was an American banker.

== Early life ==
Chew was born on October 4, 1824, in New Orleans, Louisiana, where his father served as collector of the port of New Orleans. He was one of six children of Beverly Chew (1773–1851) and Maria Theodora (née Duer) Chew (1789–1837). Three of his siblings married into the Kennedy family of Louisiana and his eldest sister, Lucy Ann Chew, married their cousin, U.S. Representative William Duer. During the Marquis de Lafayette's 1824 visit to the United States, his father hosted the French statesman at their New Orleans home. Young Alexander was born shortly thereafter and Lafayette became godfather of the boy, giving the family an "ornate silver teapot inscribed with the infant's name."

His paternal grandparents were Ann (née Fox) Chew and Col. John Chew Jr. (1740–1799), who served in the Continental Army. His maternal grandparents were Continental Congress delegate William Duer and Lady Catherine Alexander. (Note: Lady Catherine Alexander (1755–1826), was the second daughter of Sarah (née Livingston) Alexander and Gen. William Alexander, the claimant of the Scottish earldom of Stirling, and a major general in the Continental Army during the American Revolutionary War.) Among his Duer relatives were uncles William Alexander Duer and John Duer, both prominent Judges. His mother was also a cousin to Edward Livingston, the United States Senator from Louisiana.

He attended Hobart College in Geneva, New York, beginning in 1840.

== Career ==
In 1863, he was a founder of the First National Bank of Geneva. Three years after it was formed, Chew, his father-in-law Phineas Prouty, Corydon Wheat, his brother-in-law Thomas Hillhouse and Thomas Raines (later New York State Treasurer) bought out the bank and made Chew President. Shortly after he became president, First National built their headquarters on the southeast corner of Seneca and Exchange Streets in Geneva. By 1890, the Bank had assets totaling more than $370,000,000. Chew served as its president until his death in 1911. The bank was reorganized as the Geneva Trust Company in 1919.

Chew also served as a trustee of Hobart College for forty-two years and a vestryman and warden of Trinity Church in Geneva.

== Personal life ==
On January 10, 1849, Chew was married to Sarah Augusta Prouty (1825–1912), a daughter of merchant Phineas Prouty and Margaret Van Vranken. Sarah's sister, Harriet Prouty, was the wife of New York State Comptroller Thomas Hillhouse and her brother was Phineas Prouty. Together, they were the parents of:

- Beverly Chew II (1850–1924), a banker and well-known book collector who married Clarissa Tainter Pierson, a daughter of the Rev. Job Pierson and granddaughter of U.S. Representative Job Pierson, in 1872.
- Harriet Hillhouse Chew (1851–1919), who married Dr. Ernest Cleveland Coxe, son of Bishop Arthur Cleveland Coxe.
- Phineas Prouty Chew (1854–1935), a printing press manufacturer who married Marguerite Pistor in 1879.
- Thomas Hillhouse Chew (1856–1932), who never married.
- Alexander Duer Chew (1858–1927), cashier of the International Pump Co. who never married.
- Katherine Adelaide Chew (1861–1924), who married Samuel Cooper Winship, a son of Maj. Oscar Fingal Winship.
- Theodora Augusta Chew (1863–1874), who died young.
- Lillian Chew (1868–1931), who married George Wilder, vice president of the Central Bank of Rochester.

Chew died in Geneva on November 19, 1911. His second son Thomas succeeded him as president of the First National Bank of Geneva and served as president until his own death in 1932.

=== Descendants ===
Through his youngest daughter Lillian, he was a grandfather of composer Alexander Lafayette Chew Wilder (better known as Alec Wilder).
