= Beverly Chew =

American merchant and diplomat (1773–1851)

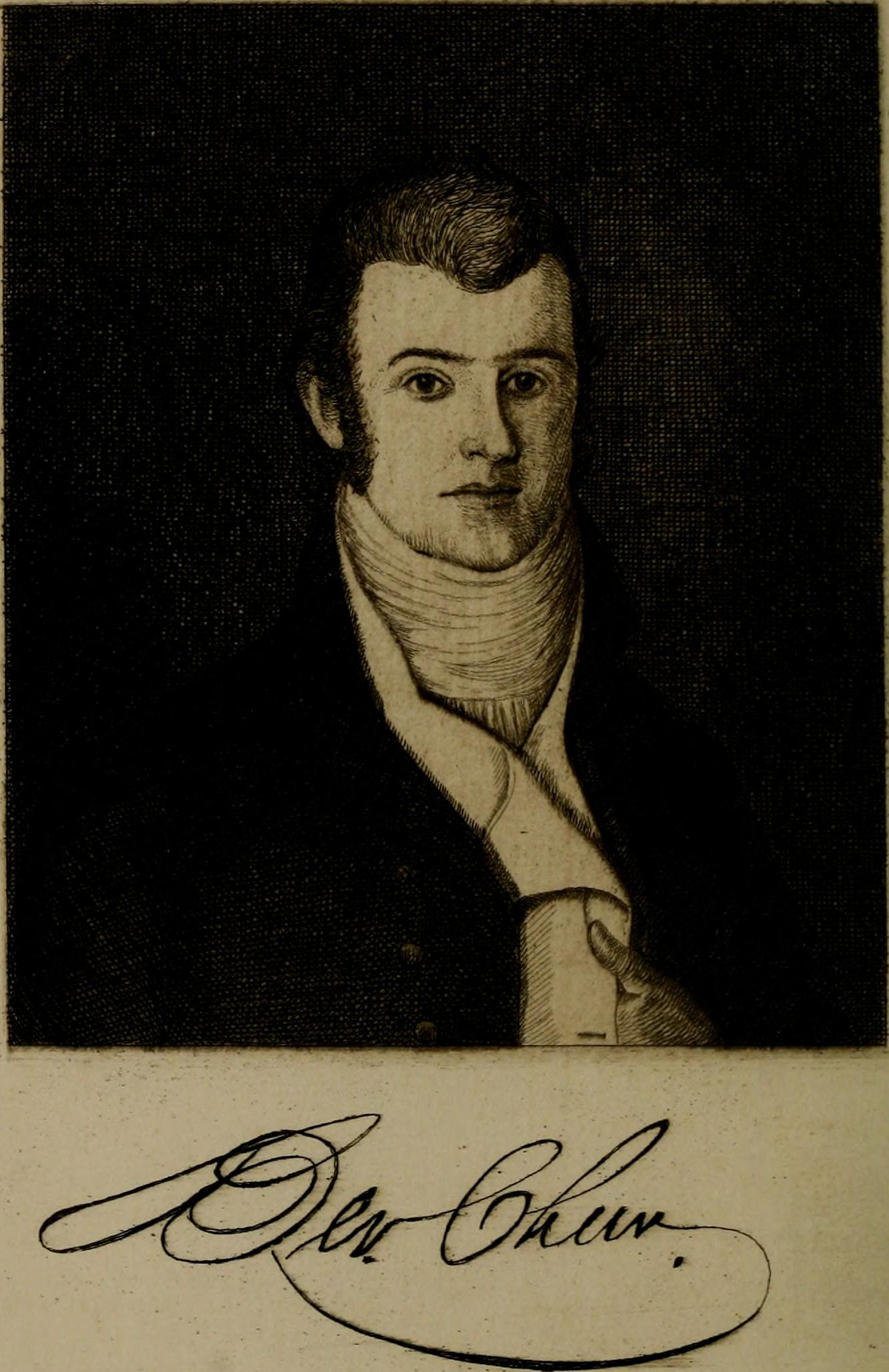
Beverly Chew

Beverly Chew (February 6, 1773 – January 13, 1851) was an American merchant and diplomat.

== Early life ==
Chew was born on February 6, 1773, in Spotsylvania County, Virginia. He was the eldest son of Col. John Chew Jr. (1740–1799), who served in the Continental Army, and Ann (née Fox) Chew (1754–1821), a daughter of Thomas Fox. His brother John Chew married Ellen Patton, sister of U.S. Representative and Acting Governor of Virginia John M. Patton.

He was a descendant of John Chew, a successful merchant, who arrived in Jamestown in 1622 on the ship Charitie; and was granted 1,600 acres (6.5 km^{2}) of land in Charles River (now York) County, Virginia. Extended members of the Chew family included Chief Justice of Delaware Samuel Chew, and his son, Benjamin Chew, Chief Justice of the Supreme Court of the Province of Pennsylvania.

== Career ==
In 1797, Chew moved to New Orleans, Louisiana where he formed a mercantile partnership with Richard Relf, known as Chew & Relf, who worked closely with Daniel William Coxe and Daniel Clark. Chew & Relf were involved in almost every major New Orleans business as originators, original shareholders, and members of the board of directors. they were exclusive agents of the London-based Phoenix Fire Insurance Co. Banking interests formed a major part of their portfolios: Chew was also a major stockholder of the Bank of Louisiana. He was an active participant in land speculation in Louisiana and Texas as well as the slave trade, and purported to be a smuggler.

In July 1812 President James Madison appointed Chew as Vice consul to Russia at New Orleans to handle commercial reciprocity between the U.S. and Russia since Russia was reportedly taking a favorable view of the American effort to defend neutral shipping rights. During the War of 1812, Chew served as a volunteer rifleman under Gen. Andrew Jackson in Beale's Rifles during the Gulf Campaign and the Battle of New Orleans.

In late 1816, following the resignation of Peter L. B. Duplessis, Chew was appointed Customs Collector for the Port of New Orleans, a prized position due to its location on the Mississippi River. He served as Collector until 1829, when President Jackson refused to reappoint him. While still Collector, he had been elected President of the New Orleans branch (opened in 1817) of the Second Bank of the United States (of which he had been a longtime member of the board of directors) before resigning to become cashier of New Orleans Canal and Banking Company in 1831. The following year, he became president of the Canal and Banking Co.

Along with Relf, Chew served as co-executor of Daniel Clark's estate, which resulted in the longest-running lawsuit in the history of the United States court system brought by Clark's daughter, Myra Clark Gaines.

== Personal life ==
On January 14, 1810, Chew was married to Maria Theodora Duer (1789–1837), a younger daughter of Continental Congress delegate William Duer and Lady Catherine Alexander. (Note: Lady Catherine Alexander (1755–1826), was the second daughter of Sarah (née Livingston) Alexander and Gen. William Alexander, the claimant of the Scottish earldom of Stirling, and a major general in the Continental Army during the American Revolutionary War.) Among her siblings were Judges William Alexander Duer and John Duer and through her mother, she was a cousin of a cousin to Edward Livingston, a United States senator from Louisiana. Together, they were the parents of six children, three of whom married into the Kennedy family of Louisiana:

- Lucy Ann Chew (1816–1900), who married her cousin, U.S. Representative William Duer, in 1835.
- John William Chew, who died unmarried.
- Catherine Alexander Chew (1820–1862), who married Judge Thomas Hall Kennedy.
- Alexander Lafayette Chew (1824–1911), who founded the First National Bank of Geneva (later known as the Geneva Trust Company) and married Sarah Augusta Prouty, daughter of merchant Phineas Prouty, in 1849. (Note: Sarah Augusta Prouty's sister, Harriet Prouty, was the wife of New York State Comptroller Thomas Hillhouse.)
- Mary Virginia Chew (1826–1863), who married Martin Gordon Kennedy.
- Morris Robinson Chew (1829–1896), who married Mary Medora Kennedy, a daughter of Judge Joseph Meisson Kennedy. (Note: Mary Medora Kennedy (1837–1901) was the daughter of Judge Joseph Meisson Kennedy (1806–1876). Judge Kennedy was the elder brother of Thomas Hall Kennedy (1813–1884) and Martin Gordon Kennedy (1825–1868), who both married daughters of Beverly Chew making Morris Robinson Chew's wife, Mary Medora Kennedy, the sister-in-law to two of her uncles.)

During the Marquis de Lafayette's 1824 visit to the United States, Chew hosted the eminent French statesman and soldier at his home. During his stay, his son Alexander was born and Lafayette became godfather of the boy. Lafayette gave the family an "ornate silver teapot inscribed with the infant's name."

His wife died in 1837. Chew died in New Orleans on January 13, 1851.

=== Descendants ===
Through his son Alexander, he was a great-grandfather of composer Alexander Lafayette Chew Wilder (better known as Alec Wilder).
