= William Duer =

William Duer may refer to:

- William Duer (Continental congressman) (1743–1799), New York speculator, Continental congressman and Assistant Secretary of the Treasury
- William Alexander Duer (1780–1858), U.S. jurist, president of Columbia University, son of the Continental congressman
- William Duer (U.S. Congressman) (1805–1879), U.S. lawyer and congressman from New York City; grandson of the Continental congressman
