= Catherine Alexander Duer =

American society figure and hostess

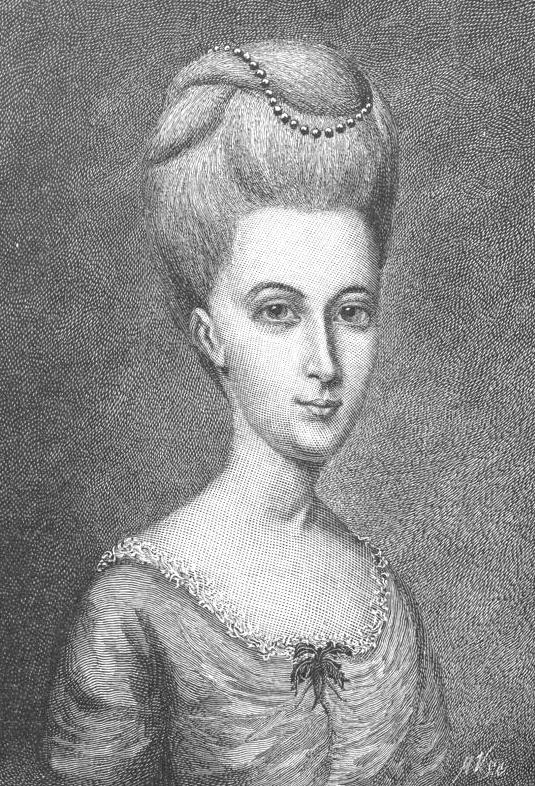
- Catherine Alexander Duer, from an 1889 publication.
- Born: Catherine Alexander; March 8, 1755
- Died: July 26, 1826 (aged 71); New York, US
- Spouse: William Duer (Continental Congressman)
- Children: William Alexander Duer, John Duer
- Parent: William Alexander, Lord Stirling

Catherine Alexander Duer (March 8, 1755 – July 26, 1826) was a society figure and political hostess in the early American republic.

== Early life ==
Catherine Alexander was born in 1755, the daughter of General William Alexander and Sarah Livingston Alexander. Her father was called "Lord Stirling" (though his claim to the title was disputed) and she was sometimes known as "Lady Kitty". She was from a prominent New York family: her grandfathers were James Alexander, was a lawyer in colonial New York, and Philip Livingston. Her paternal grandmother was merchant Mary Alexander. Among her great-grandparents were Robert Livingston and Alida Schuyler, daughter of Philip Pieterse Schuyler.

Catherine Alexander's maternal uncles included Philip Livingston, a signer of the Declaration of Independence, William Livingston, first Governor of New Jersey, and Peter Van Brugh Livingston, first treasurer of New York State. One of her first cousins was Sarah Livingston Jay.

== Society hostess and legacy ==
In 1779, George Washington attended the New Jersey wedding of Catherine Alexander and William Duer. Duer was a member of the Continental Congress, and a signer of the Articles of Confederation. The couple later attended Washington's first Inaugural Ball. Her portrait was painted on ivory by Charles Willson Peale.

Duer's husband accumulated enormous debts, enough to be considered a cause of the Panic of 1792; he was jailed in 1792 and died in debtors' prison in 1799. She maintained her social connections, though she moved to a small house in New York City; she hosted Harriet and Maria Trumbull, teenaged daughters of Connecticut governor Jonathan Trumbull Jr., when they visited New York in 1800-1801. In 1801, she remarried to a merchant, William Neilson. She died in 1826, aged 71 years. Her letters are in the William Duer Papers at the New-York Historical Society Library.

The Duers had eight children between 1780 and 1793. Her son William Alexander Duer was a judge and president of Columbia University. Another son, John Duer, was also a judge, Chief Justice of the New York Superior Court. Her grandson William Duer was a Congressman and diplomat. Later descendants were poet Alice Duer Miller and New York suffragist, socialite, and novelist Katherine Duer Mackay.
