= Edward Judson =

Edward Judson may refer to:

- Edward Judson (theologian)
- Edward Judson (trade unionist)
- Edward B. Judson, American politician and banker
