= Caleb Lyon =

American politician (1822–1875)

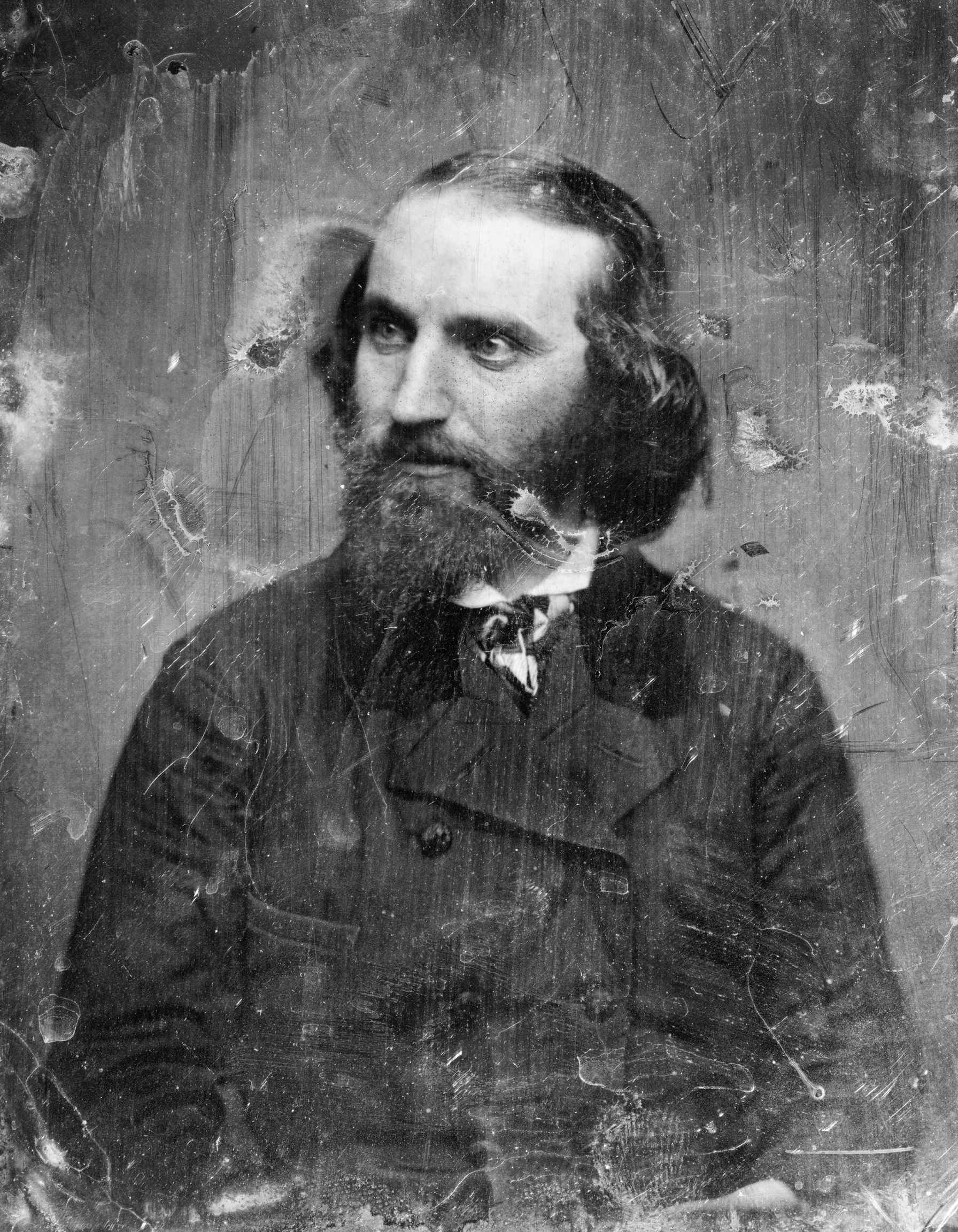

2nd Governor of Idaho Territory
- In office 1864–1865
- Preceded by: William H. Wallace
- Succeeded by: David W. Ballard

Member of the U.S. House of Representatives from New York's 23rd district
- In office March 4, 1853 – March 3, 1855
- Preceded by: Leander Babcock
- Succeeded by: William A. Gilbert

Personal details
- Born: December 7, 1822 Greig, New York
- Died: September 8, 1875 (aged 52) Rossville, Staten Island, New York
- Resting place: Greenwood Cemetery
- Party: Independent (1850s), Republican (1860s)

Caleb Lyon (December 7, 1822 – September 8, 1875) was a 19th-century American politician who served one term in the U.S.. House of Representatives from New York from 1853 to 1855 and later became Governor of Idaho Territory from 1864 to 1865 during the last half of the American Civil War.

== Biography ==
Caleb Lyon was the son of Marietta Henrietta Dupont (1788–1869) and Caleb Lyon (1761–1835). In 1841, he married Mary Ann Springsteen. They had a son Caleb (b. 1842) and a daughter Henrietta Frederica (b. 1843).

He attended and graduated from the American Literary, Scientific and Military Academy (later Norwich University), Class of 1841.

== Career ==
In 1847, he was appointed US Consul to Shanghai, but never made it to China – instead he moved to California, and was credited as the designer of the California State Seal adopted in 1849, although the actual design was by Robert S. Garnett.

=== State legislature ===
Lyon was an Independent member of the New York State Assembly (Lewis Co.) in 1851. He resigned his seat on April 26, and was elected to the New York State Senate on May 27, serving during the 74th New York State Legislature's special session in June/July 1851.

=== Congress ===
Lyon was elected as an Independent to the 33rd United States Congress, holding office from March 4, 1853, to March 3, 1855.

=== Tenure as Idaho governor ===
Appointed by President Abraham Lincoln in 1864, as Governor of Idaho Territory, Lyon proved to be extremely unpopular. One journalist wrote he was "a conceited, peculiar man, who made many enemies and misappropriated much of the public funds."

During Lyon's administration, the territorial capital was moved from Lewiston to Boise, reputedly because Lyon thought it was better to have the capital in a larger city.

Lyon started a diamond-prospecting frenzy when he claimed that a prospector had found a diamond near Ruby City, Idaho. Although hundreds of men staked claims, no genuine diamonds were found as a result.

In 1866, an audit showed that Lyon had embezzled $46,418 in federal funds which were intended for the Nez Perce people. He was never convicted on any charges.

== Later life ==
After Lyon's governorship ended, he returned to his home in Rossville, Staten Island, New York, where he purchased a home known as "Ross Castle" in 1859. A small collection of Lyon's papers is preserved by the Staten Island Historical Society at Historic Richmond Town in New York, along with various artifacts associated with the Lyon family.

== Death and burial ==
He died on September 8, 1875, and is interred at Greenwood Cemetery, Brooklyn, Kings County, New York, US.

New York State Assembly
| Preceded by John Newkirk | New York State Assembly; Lewis County; 1851 | Succeeded by Dean S. Howard |
New York State Senate
| Preceded by Alanson Skinner | New York State Senate; 21st District; 1851 | Succeeded by Ashley Davenport |
U.S. House of Representatives
| Preceded by Leander Babcock | Member of the U.S. House of Representatives from New York's 23rd congressional district 1853–1855 | Succeeded by William A. Gilbert |
Political offices
| Preceded by William H. Wallace | Governor of Idaho Territory; 1864–1866 | Succeeded by David W. Ballard |
