= David W. Ballard =

American politician

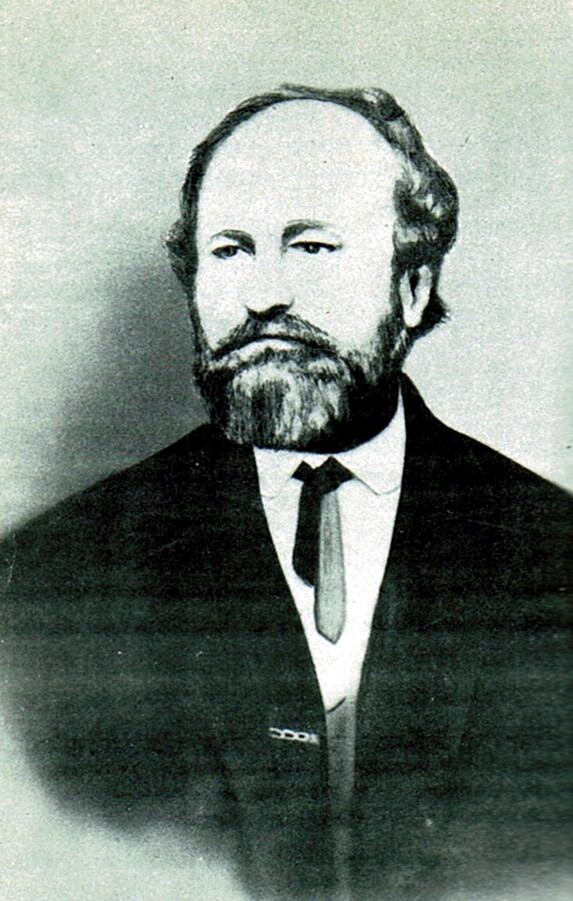

3rd Governor of Idaho Territory
- In office 1866–1870
- Preceded by: Caleb Lyon
- Succeeded by: Thomas M. Bowen

Personal details
- Born: February 21, 1824 Bridgeport, Indianapolis, U.S.
- Died: September 18, 1883 (aged 59) Lebanon, Oregon, U.S.
- Party: Republican
- Education: University of Cincinnati College of Medicine (MD)

David Ballard (February 21, 1824 – September 18, 1883) was an American politician and medical doctor who served as the third governor of Idaho Territory from 1866 to 1870. Unlike many territorial governors of the Reconstruction Era, Ballard resided in his jurisdiction during his tenure. A physician by trade, Ballard actively practiced medicine in Boise throughout his tenure as territorial governor.

== Early life and education ==
Ballard was born in Bridgeport, Indiana. He studied medicine in his native town and graduated from the University of Cincinnati College of Medicine.

== Career ==
Ballard soon grew a large medical practice in Monrovia, Indiana. He later relocated with his family to Linn County, six miles from Lebanon, Oregon Territory. Again his medical practice grew large and his neighbors developed a trust in his integrity. He was elected to the Oregon State Senate soon after Oregon's admission to statehood in 1859.

=== Territorial governor ===
On the recommendation of Oregon Senator George Henry Williams, Ballard was appointed territorial governor by President Andrew Johnson in April 1866. When he arrived in Idaho Territory in June he found the government in serious disarray. The territory was still reeling from the mismanagement of Ballard's predecessor, Caleb Lyon, deeply divided over the controversial decision to move the capital from Lewiston to Boise, and nearly broke because former territorial secretary Horace C. Gilson had embezzled most of the territory's funds while serving as acting governor between Lyon and Ballard's administrations.

A Republican who supported the Union during the Civil War, Ballard often clashed with the overwhelmingly-Democratic and pro-Confederate territorial legislature. At the time many of the top federally appointed officials in Idaho Territory hailed from Oregon, particularly from Yamhill County. These officials were strongly linked to Radical Republican policies, which were unpopular in Idaho Territory. Although Ballard was not from Yamhill County, as an Oregonian he was often associated with this group.

==== Legislative pay controversy ====
Upon his arrival, Ballard learned that the legislature of 1865 had passed an act abolishing extra pay for the governor and secretary, but retaining, and even increasing, their own and that of their clerks. Public furor over this arbitrary exercise of power caused the legislature to restore it a few days afterward by another act. Ballard, in response, approved of the measure, and suggested that the territory be saved the whole of the extra money, including monies to Democratic legislators.

Despite this, the territorial legislature contacted federal Treasury Secretary Hugh McCulloch and advised him they were three sessions behind in pay due to the embezzlement and Lyon's disastrous administration. In response territorial secretary Solomon R. Howlett informed McCulloch that many of the legislators had refused to sign an oath of allegiance to the union per an 1862 act of Congress and were therefore ineligible for any back pay to begin with. Although McCulloch allocated the territory $20,000 towards legislative back pay, he advised Howlett not to pay any legislator who hadn't signed the "ironclad oath of allegiance" upon election. The legislature responded by passing a bill exempting itself from the federal law, claiming that it only applied to Washington appointees. Calling the legislation "presumptuous," Ballard vetoed it on the grounds that it violated the Idaho Organic Act of 1863, which established the territory. Legislators reacted violently, and within hours either Ballard or Howlett ordered federal troops to enter legislative chambers to quell the unrest. In January 1867 Howlett offered back pay to any legislator willing to sign the oath retroactively, effectively defusing the situation.

Nevertheless, the Idaho Territorial Legislature attempted to have Ballard removed from office. In 1867 Idaho Territory's Democratic Congressional delegate Edward Dexter Holbrook temporarily convinced President Andrew Johnson to suspend Ballard and nominate Isaac Gibbs to replace him, but Johnson soon changed his mind and Ballard remained.

=== Later career ===
By 1869, Ballard's administration patched many its differences with the territorial legislature and managed to address many of the serious issues it inherited. Upon the expiration of his term of office in 1870, two-thirds of the citizens of Idaho Territory petitioned for Ballard's reappointment by President Ulysses S. Grant, but by the time it reached Grant he had already appointed a successor, Gilman Marston, who ultimately declined the position. Three subsequent appointees either declined or quickly resigned the post until Grant finally found a lasting replacement in Thomas W. Bennett, several months after Ballard left office.

Ballard returned to Oregon after his term expired. There, he resumed and expanded his medical practice which became the largest in the state. He also returned to the Oregon State Senate.

== Personal life ==
He married Jane Eliza Rooker (1831–1891) in 1848 in Morgan County, Indiana. They had nine children: Lonner L., Oscar, Frank Rooker, Florence E., Carrie, Maud M., Ora, and two daughters, Amanda D. and Mary J., who died in infancy. Ballard was a direct descendant of Thomas Ballard Jr., the chief founder of Yorktown, Virginia in 1705; speaker of the Virginia House of Burgesses, beginning in 1692; and who granted his land in 1693 to trustees for the founding of the College of William and Mary.

Ballard died on September 18, 1883, at age 59. He is interred at Lebanon Pioneer Cemetery in Lebanon, Oregon.
