= Maria Trumbull =

American published letter writer (1785–1805)

Maria Trumbull (1785–1805) was a published letter writer. She became Maria Trumbull Hudson with her marriage to Henry Hudson. Her father was Governor Jonathan Trumbull Jr.

== Early life ==
Maria Trumbull was born February 14, 1785, and baptized in Lebanon, Connecticut on February 20, 1785. She was the daughter of Governor Jonathan Trumbull Jr. (1740–1809) and Eunice Backus, who made a pious and wealthy family. Her father, the son of fellow Governor Jonathan Trumbull (1710–1785), was a merchant and a politician. Her family, although wealthy, lived a simple, magnanimous life in Lebanon, Connecticut.

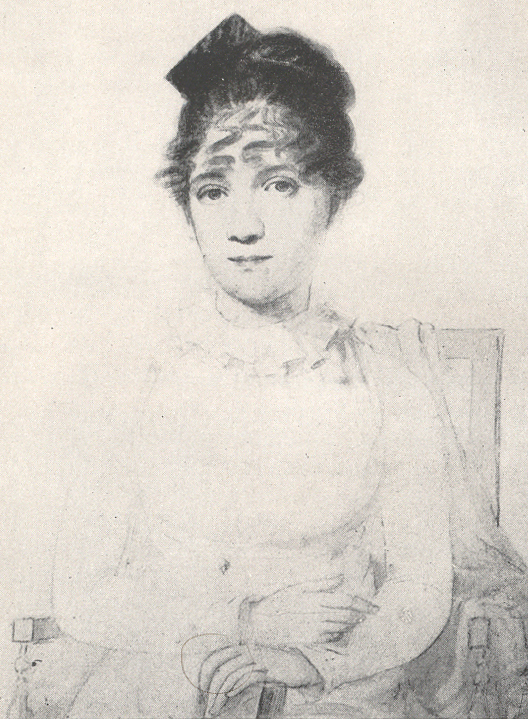
Portrait of Harriett Trumbull from a crayon sketch by her uncle John Trumbull, Yale University Art Gallery

She had two sisters, Faith and Harriet (later wife of Benjamin Silliman), and two brothers who died when infants. Trumbull and her sister Harriet spent the winter of 1800 and spring of 1801 in New York City where they came out to New York society. The teenage girls stayed at the home of Lady Kitty Duer. Friends of their parents planned for lessons and social activities for the girls. They had music, dancing, and drawing lessons. Their letters to their parents provided insight into their lives of lessons, parties, plays, and more. The letters were published in the book A season in New York, 1801. The book provides insight into the inner thoughts of 19th-century girls as they experienced life in a big city.

== Marriage and death ==
In 1804, Trumbull married Henry Hudson of Hartford, Connecticut, son of Hannah Bunce Watson (newspaper publisher) and Barzillai Hudson (newspaper editor), They had a son, Jonathan Trumbull Hudson. She died of complications of childbirth at on November 23, 1805 and was buried at the Center Church Burial Ground in Hartford, Connecticut. A poet wrote of her:

Light as the gossamer, with fairy feet,

Maria moves, with graciousness replete,
Artfulness as truth it seems – and oath bestows,

The modest smile that softens as she goes.

Henry Hudson was the mayor of Hartford, Connecticut from 1836 to 1840.
