= Leander Babcock =

American politician

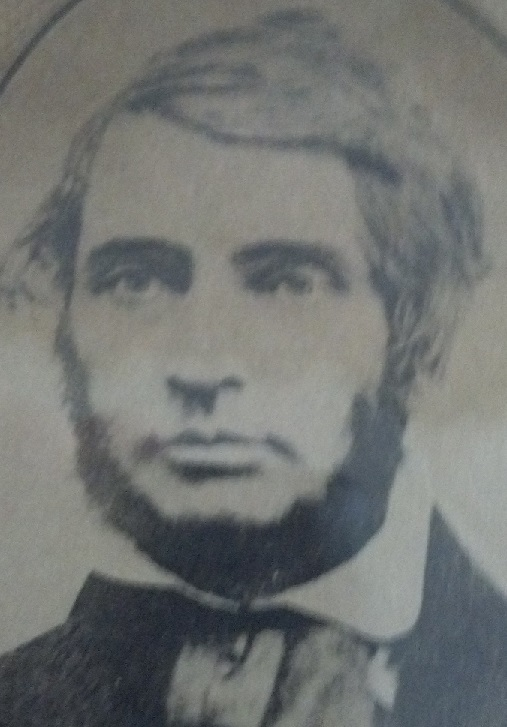

Member of the U.S. House of Representatives from New York's 23rd district
- In office March 4, 1851 – March 3, 1853
- Preceded by: William Duer
- Succeeded by: Caleb Lyon

Personal details
- Born: March 1, 1811 Paris, New York
- Died: August 18, 1864 (aged 53) Richfield Springs, New York
- Resting place: Riverside Cemetery
- Citizenship: United States
- Party: Democratic Party
- Spouse: Ellen B. Babcock
- Education: Union College
- Profession: Attorney, politician

Leander Babcock (March 1, 1811 – August 18, 1864) was an American lawyer and politician who served one term as a Democratic United States Representative for the 23rd district of New York from 1851 to 1853.

== Biography ==
Babcock was born in Paris, New York, in 1811. He first attended Hamilton College and then transferred to Union College where he was a member of Kappa Alpha Society and was elected to Phi Beta Kappa, and graduated in 1830. He studied law at Union College and was admitted to the New York bar in 1834.

== Career ==
Babcock moved to Oswego, New York, where he practiced law. From 1840 to 1843, he served as the district attorney for Oswego County. He then became mayor of Oswego.

=== Congress and later career ===
Elected to the 32nd United States Congress, Babcock served from March 4, 1851, to March 3, 1853.

After his term in office, he returned to Oswego and served as president of its board of education in 1855 and as an alderman from 1856 to 1858.

== Death ==
Babcock died in Richfield Springs, New York, on August 18, 1864, aged 53. He is interred at Riverside Cemetery in Oswego, New York.

U.S. House of Representatives
Preceded by William Duer	Member of the U.S. House of Representatives from New York's 23rd congressional district 1851–1853	Succeeded by Caleb Lyon
