= Kelvin Martin =

American criminal (1964–1987)

- Martin, c. 1985.
- Born: July 24, 1964; The Bronx, New York City, U.S.
- Died: October 24, 1987 (aged 23); Brooklyn, New York City, U.S.
- Resting place: Silver Mount Cemetery (Staten Island, New York)
- Other names: 50 Cent; 50
- Known for: Inspiration for the name of 50 Cent

Kelvin Darnell Martin (July 24, 1964 – October 24, 1987), also known as 50 Cent, was an American criminal based in Fort Greene Brooklyn, New York. Martin is primarily known as the inspiration for the name of rapper 50 Cent.

== Biography ==
Born in the Bronx borough of New York City, Martin was partially raised there by his grandmother, Irene Martin. He later moved to Brooklyn, residing in the Fort Greene district. Martin was possibly known as '50 Cent' due to his reputation of being prepared to rob anyone, regardless of how much money they were carrying at the time. Another story is that it came from an incident when he entered a game of dice with 50 cents and ended up walking away with $500. Martin spent time in Rikers Island as a youth. The nickname may also be an allusion to his small stature—he weighed only 120 pounds (54 kg), and his height was 5 ft 2 in (157 cm).

On October 20, 1987, Martin was shot in the stairway of his girlfriend's building in the Albany Houses of Crown Heights, dying at Kings County Hospital four days later. Julio "WeMo" Acevedo was convicted of first-degree manslaughter and "served about a decade" in prison for Martin's killing.

=== Legacy ===
Martin's life and influence were chronicled in an in-depth biographical documentary, starting from his upbringing and carrying through past his death. The documentary is called The Infamous Times, Volume I: The Original 50 Cent. The film has sold 200,000 copies independently.
