= Phineas Prouty =

American merchant (1827–1891)

Phineas Prouty (November 8, 1827 – July 2, 1891) was a wealthy American merchant from Geneva, New York.

== Early life ==
Prouty was born on November 8, 1827, in Geneva, New York. He was the youngest of four children born to Phineas Prouty (1788–1862) and Margaret Matilda (née Van Vranken) Prouty (1795–1830). His father had been born in New Hampshire but grew up in Newport, Vermont, before moving to Schenectady, where his older brother had a hardware business, serving in the War of 1812, and settling in Geneva by 1815, opening a copper, tin, and sheet iron factory. One sister, Harriet Prouty, was the wife of New York State Comptroller Thomas Hillhouse, and another, Sarah Augusta Prouty, was the wife of banker Alexander Lafayette Chew.

Prouty was trained in law and was admitted to the bar, but never actively practiced.

== Career ==
In the 1850s, Prouty took over his father's hardware business although he did not enjoy the merchant business. In April 1864, after his father's death, Prouty and his brother-in-law Chew sold the hardware business to Underhill & Bellows while Prouty retained his family's Seneca Street building. He used his inheritance to invest in several companies, including the First National Bank of Geneva, the Geneva Saving Bank, the Geneva Optical Company, the Geneva and Ithaca Railroad, Geneva Water Works Co., Phillips and Clark Stove Co., and the Geneva Preserving Company.

In 1881, Prouty was a founding trustee of the Metropolitan Trust Company in New York City which was organized by his brother-in-law Gen. Thomas Hillhouse, who had just resigned as the Assistant Treasurer of the United States in New York City (following eleven years in that position after being appointed by President Ulysses S. Grant in 1870. Hillhouse served as president until his death in July 1897 when he was succeeded by Brayton Ives.

== Personal life ==
On September 18, 1855, Prouty was married to Adelaide "Kit" Cobleigh (1835–1900), a daughter of Andrew Mattison Cobleigh and Wealthy Ann (née Bartlett) Cobleigh. Together, they were the parents of:

- Margaret Matilda Prouty (1856–1931) who married Augustus M. Swift in 1884. After his death she married the Rev. Richard Davenport Harlan, eldest son of John Marshall Harlan, an Associate Justice of the Supreme Court of the United States and Malvina French Shanklin.
- Adelaide Alexander Prouty (1858–) who married Dr. Walter Chrystie of Bryn Mawr, Pennsylvania, in 1887.
- Harriet Prouty (1863–1884), who died young.
- Anna Madison Prouty (1864–1943), who married Edward Kirkpatrick Beddall, an insurance man in New York City, in 1891.
- Phineas Prouty (1875–1926), who married Frances Sheldon Jerome in 1897.

Prouty died of asthma on July 2, 1891.
