= Edmund P. Gaines =

American general (1777–1849)

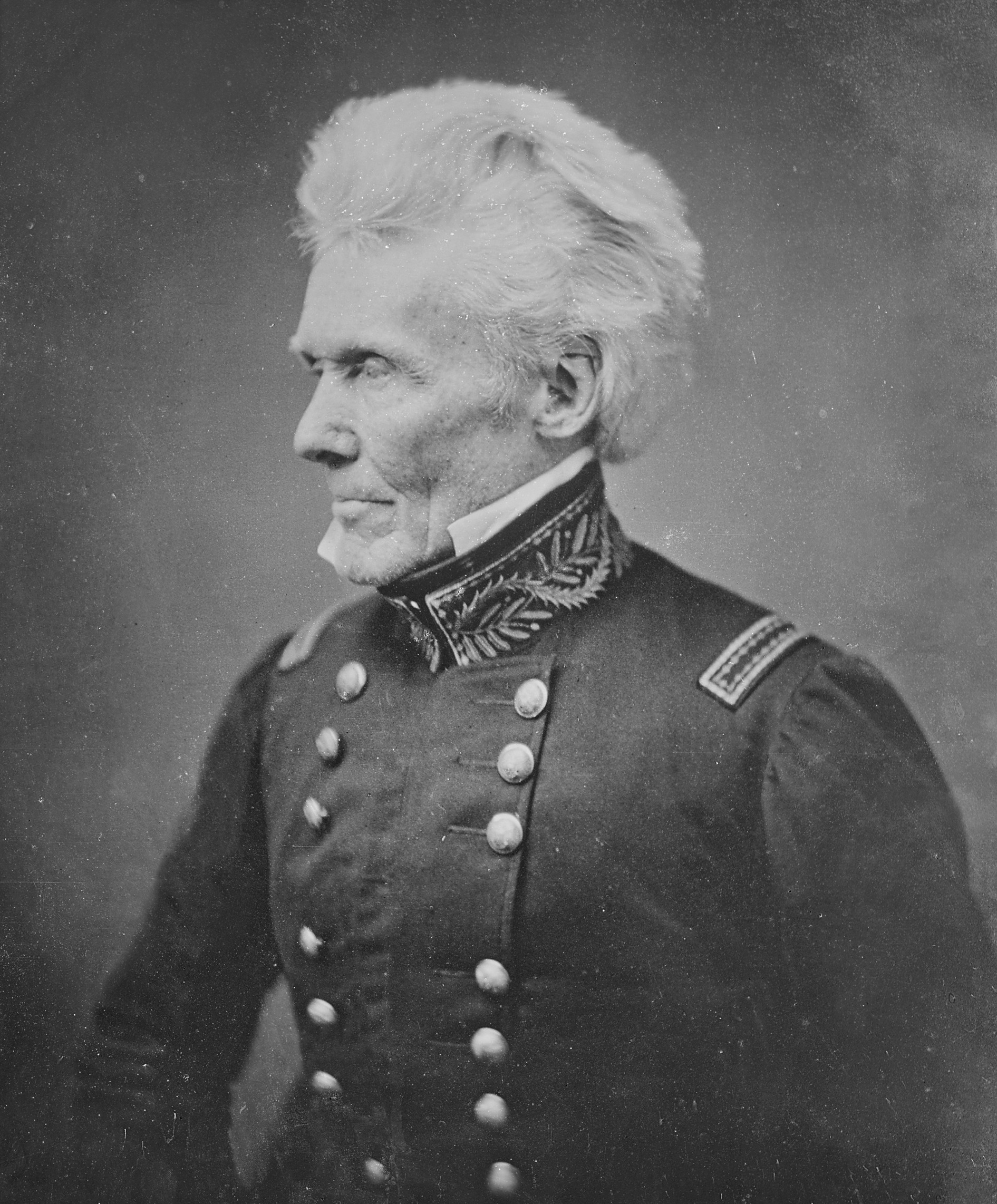
- Gaines in c. 1845
- Born: March 20, 1777; Culpeper County, Virginia, U.S.
- Died: June 6, 1849 (aged 72); New Orleans, Louisiana, U.S.
- Burial place: Church Street Graveyard, Mobile, Alabama, U.S.
- Spouses: Frances Toulmin (m. 1806; died 1811) Barbara Blount (m. 1815; died 1836) Myra Clark Whitney (m. 1839)
- Children: 3
- Relatives: George S. Gaines (brother); Edmund Pendleton (great-uncle)
- Military career
- Allegiance: United States
- Branch: United States Army
- Service years: 1799–1800; 1801–1849
- Rank: Brigadier General; Brevet Major General
- Commands: Fort Stoddert; 25th Infantry; Fort Erie; Army of the Niagara; Fourth Military District; Western Military Department; Southwest Military District; Western Division
- Conflicts: War of 1812; Seminole Wars; Black Hawk War; Mexican–American War
- Awards: Congressional Gold Medal

Edmund Pendleton Gaines (March 20, 1777 – June 6, 1849) was an American military officer who served for nearly fifty years, and attained the rank of major general by brevet. He was one of the United States Army's senior commanders during its formative years in the early to mid-1800s, and was a veteran of the War of 1812, Seminole Wars, Black Hawk War, and Mexican–American War.

A native of Culpeper County, Virginia, he was named for his great-uncle Edmund Pendleton. Gaines was educated in Virginia and joined the Army as an ensign in 1799. He served for a year before being discharged, but returned to service in 1801 and remained in uniform until his death. In the early years of his military career, Gaines carried out important tasks including construction of a federal post road from Nashville, Tennessee to Natchez, Mississippi.

As commander of Fort Stoddert in 1807, he detained Aaron Burr, and Gaines subsequently testified at Burr's trial for treason. During the War of 1812, Gaines advanced through the ranks to colonel as commander of the 25th Infantry Regiment and he fought with distinction at the Battle of Crysler's Farm. Gaines was promoted to brigadier general during the war, and received a brevet promotion to major general.

Gaines' post-war service included diplomacy with and military engagements against various tribes of Native Americans, though Gaines later opposed Andrew Jackson's Indian removal policy. One of Gaines' most infamous actions was the 1816 destruction of Negro Fort in Spanish-held Florida. Filled with escaped slaves, the enclave was viewed as a challenge to the authority of nearby slaveholding states. More than 270 people occupied the fort, including many African Americans who had escaped slavery. When the fort was taken they were captured, killed, or re-enslaved.

The 1828 death of Jacob Brown, the Army's senior officer, touched off a bitter feud between Gaines and Winfield Scott over which had seniority and the best claim to succeed to command. The quarrel became public and President John Quincy Adams decided to bypass both Gaines and Scott to offer the post to Alexander Macomb. When Macomb died in 1841, President John Tyler quickly headed off a rekindling of the Gaines–Scott dispute by appointing Scott as the Army's commanding general. Gaines continued to serve as a district, department and division commander, but became increasingly marginalized as Scott gained influence.

At the start of the Mexican–American War, Gaines was stationed in Louisiana and issued a public call throughout the southern and southwestern states for volunteers to join Zachary Taylor's army. He faced a court-martial for recruiting without prior authorization, but successfully defended his actions. Gaines died in New Orleans, Louisiana and was buried at Church Street Graveyard in Mobile, Alabama.

== Early life ==
Edmund Pendleton Gaines was born in Culpeper County, Virginia on March 20, 1777, the seventh of fourteen children born to James and Elizabeth (Strother) Gaines. He was named after his great-uncle Edmund Pendleton, who was a political leader of Virginia during the Revolution. James Gaines had been a captain of militia during the Revolutionary War and afterwards moved his family to North Carolina. After the move, James Gaines was a delegate to the state convention that ratified the United States Constitution and became a member of the North Carolina House of Representatives.

The James Gaines family later moved to Kingsport, Tennessee. Edmund Gaines completed his early education in Tennessee and studied law in preparation for a career as an attorney. He was also elected first lieutenant of a local militia company. William C. C. Claiborne recommended Gaines for a commission, and he joined the army in 1799 as an ensign.

Gaines served with the 6th Infantry Regiment until the end of the Quasi-War with France that had caused a temporary expansion of the army. He was discharged in 1800, but returned to service as a second lieutenant in 1801. He was promoted to first lieutenant in 1802, and captain in 1807.

== Mississippi Territory ==
In the early 19th century, Gaines surveyed routes and boundaries in the Mississippi Territory including parts of the Natchez Trace. In 1800, he commanded ten companies of the 2nd Infantry Regiment in the construction of the federal post road from Nashville to Natchez. His experience led him to become a strong advocate of using the military to construct a national railroad system.

In 1807, Gaines was the commandant of Fort Stoddert. During this time, he and Nicholas Perkins III arrested former Vice President Aaron Burr in Wakefield, Alabama after Burr was alleged to be involved in a conspiracy to separate the western states from the rest of the country. Burr was detained by a military guard under Gaines's command and later turned over to federal authorities, who transported him to Richmond, Virginia. Burr was tried later that year, and Gaines testified at his trial, describing the circumstances that led to Burr's identification and arrest. Burr was acquitted on September 1, 1807.

From 1807 to 1808, Gaines surveyed the route of the Gaines Trace road between the Tennessee River near the mouth of the Elk River and the town of Cotton Gin Port, Mississippi. Afterwards, he took a leave of absence from the army to practice law in Mississippi Territory. While practicing law, Gaines also accepted a commission to serve as judge of Pascagoula Parish.

== War of 1812 ==
The War of 1812 brought Gaines back to military duty and he was appointed a major in the 8th Infantry Regiment. In July 1812, he became lieutenant colonel of the 24th Infantry Regiment. In 1813, he was promoted to colonel and commanded the 25th Infantry Regiment with distinction at the Battle of Crysler's Farm.

Later in 1813, Gaines became adjutant of the Army of the Northwest, commanded by General William Henry Harrison, and was with Harrison at the Battle of the Thames. He was promoted to brigadier general on March 9, 1814, and commanded the post at Fort Erie after the U.S. captured it from the British. General Jacob Brown was wounded at the Battle of Lundy's Lane and when the Army of the Niagara returned to the fort, command of this force was passed to Gaines.

During the Siege of Fort Erie, Gaines was in command when a British assault was repulsed on August 15, 1814. For this victory – the First Battle of Fort Erie – Gaines was awarded the Thanks of Congress, a Congressional Gold Medal, and a brevet promotion to major general. Gaines was seriously wounded by artillery fire and Brown returned to command. Gaines' wound ended his active field duty for the rest of the war, and he was given command of the Fourth Military District with headquarters in Philadelphia.

== Indian affairs ==
After the War of 1812, post-conflict downsizing of the Army led to appointment of Jacob Brown and Andrew Jackson as the Army's two major generals, with Winfield Scott, Alexander Macomb, Eleazer Wheelock Ripley and Gaines as the Army's four brigadier generals. Jackson became commander of the army's Southern Division, Brown became commander of the army's Northern Division, and the brigadier generals were assigned leadership of departments within the divisions.

In 1817, Gaines was named U.S. Commissioner to the Creek Indians. During this time, he oversaw the construction of Fort Crawford in the Alabama Territory. He also continued a bitter feud with Scott that centered over which had seniority, as both hoped to eventually succeed the ailing Brown. (Note: The dispute arose over whether regular or brevet promotions took priority. Gaines argued for regular commissions, because Scott and Gaines were both officially promoted to colonel on March 12, 1813, and brigadier general on March 9, 1814 and Gaines's name appeared before Scott's on those orders, which would make him senior to Scott. Scott argued for brevets, because he received his brevet promotion to major general on July 25, 1814, three weeks earlier than Gaines's August 15 brevet, which would make Scott senior to Gaines.) In 1821, Congress reorganized the army, leaving Brown as the sole major general and Scott and Gaines as the lone brigadier generals; Macomb accepted demotion to colonel and appointment as the chief of engineers, while Ripley and Jackson both left the army.

When Brown died in 1828, Gaines and Scott continued to quarrel over seniority. An annoyed President John Quincy Adams responded by appointing Macomb as Brown's successor. In 1830, Gaines opposed President Andrew Jackson's policy of Indian removal, but Jackson directed that it continue to be implemented. In 1831, tensions with the Sauk people increased because of their efforts to cross the Mississippi River from Iowa to Illinois and establish homes in their former lands on the Illinois side. In response, Gaines led troops to counter the forces of Sauk leader Black Hawk. After defeating Black Hawk, Gaines conducted negotiations that resulted in a capitulation agreement by which Black Hawk agreed to return to Iowa.

Gaines commanded the Western Military Department during the 1832 Black Hawk War, but illness prevented him from taking active command. He was still in command of the department during the initial stages of the 1835 to 1842 Second Seminole War. Gaines personally led an expedition and was wounded in the mouth at the 1835 Battle of Ouithlacoochie. On February 20, 1836, Gaines and his men were the first U.S. soldiers to visit the scene of the Dade Massacre in Florida, where they identified and interred the bodies.

== Southwestern frontier ==
In 1836, Gaines was placed in command of the Southwest Military District. He was given instructions to fortify the border of the Louisiana Territory and Texas to prevent the Mexican army from threatening U.S. territory. He was also given orders to prevent U.S. soldiers or volunteers from crossing into Texas and fighting in the rebellion. When Alexander Macomb died in June 1841, he was still serving as the Army's commanding general. John Bell, the Secretary of War recalled the previous Scott-Gaines dispute over seniority; he quickly recommended Scott for the position in order to prevent the dispute from restarting. President John Tyler concurred, and Scott was appointed in July.

Gaines was in command of the Army's Western Division at the outbreak of the Mexican–American War. Eager to overshadow Scott, Gaines unsuccessfully attempted to claim jurisdiction over supplies and administration of Army activities related to the war, and was reprimanded by the U.S. government for overstepping his authority when he called up Louisiana volunteers to join the force commanded by Zachary Taylor. Gaines was court-martialed for his continued efforts to call up volunteers, but was able to successfully defend himself.

== Later life ==
Though Gaines was the Army's senior brigadier general, several individuals were promoted to major general over him during the Mexican War, including Zachary Taylor, Gideon Johnson Pillow, and John A. Quitman. He was in command of the Western Division when he died in New Orleans, Louisiana on June 6, 1849. He was interred in the Church Street Graveyard in Mobile, Alabama.

== Legacy ==
A number of places in the United States were named in his honor, including Gainesvilles in Florida, Texas, Georgia, and New York; Gaines Township in Michigan; and Gainesboro in Tennessee. He was also the namesake of Gaines Streets in Tallahassee, Florida, and Davenport, Iowa. In addition, Fort Gaines, a historic fort on Dauphin Island, Alabama, was named for him.

== Personal life ==
A member of the Freemasons, Gaines was raised in Fayetteville, North Carolina's Phoenix Lodge No. 8.

Gaines was married three times and widowed twice. His first marriage was in 1806 to Frances Toulmin (1788–1811), the daughter of Harry Toulmin, who died giving birth. His second marriage was in 1815 to Barbara Blount (1792–1836), daughter of Tennessee statesman William Blount. His last marriage was in 1839 to Myra Clark Whitney (1806–1885), daughter of Louisiana politician Daniel Clark.

Gaines was the father of three children, a daughter and two sons. Son Henry Toulmin Gaines was born in 1811 and died in 1876. (Note: The death notice for Henry T. Gaines uses the middle initial "G," but the description of the subject makes clear that it references Henry T. Gaines.) Son Edmund Pendleton Gaines Jr. was born in 1820 and died in 1904. Daughter Elizabeth Virginia Gaines was born in 1840 died in 1941.

== Dates of rank ==
Gaines' effective dates of rank included:

- Ensign – January 10, 1799
- Second Lieutenant – March 3, 1799
- Discharged – June 15, 1800
- Second Lieutenant – February 16, 1801
- First Lieutenant – April 27, 1802
- Captain – February 28, 1807
- Major – March 24, 1812
- Lieutenant Colonel – July 6, 1812
- Colonel – March 12, 1813
- Brigadier General – March 9, 1814
- Major General (Brevet) – August 15, 1814

== Photos ==
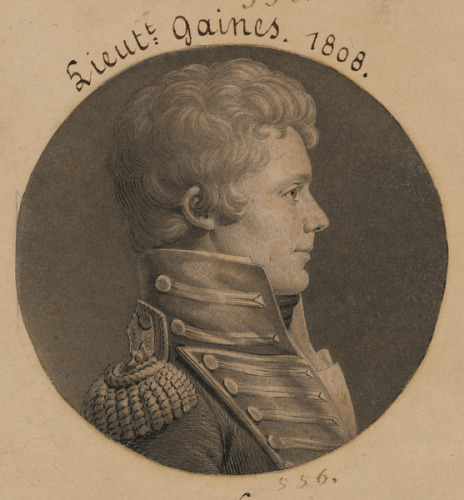
Charles Balthazar Julien Févret de Saint-Mémin engraving of Gaines as a first lieutenant in 1808

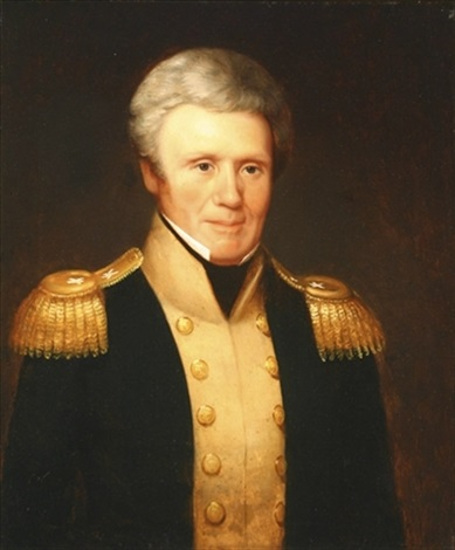
John Wesley Jarvis portrait, circa 1820

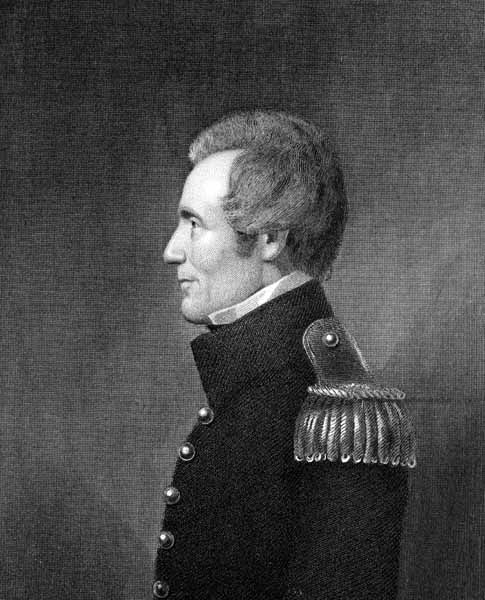
Engraving of Gaines circa 1835

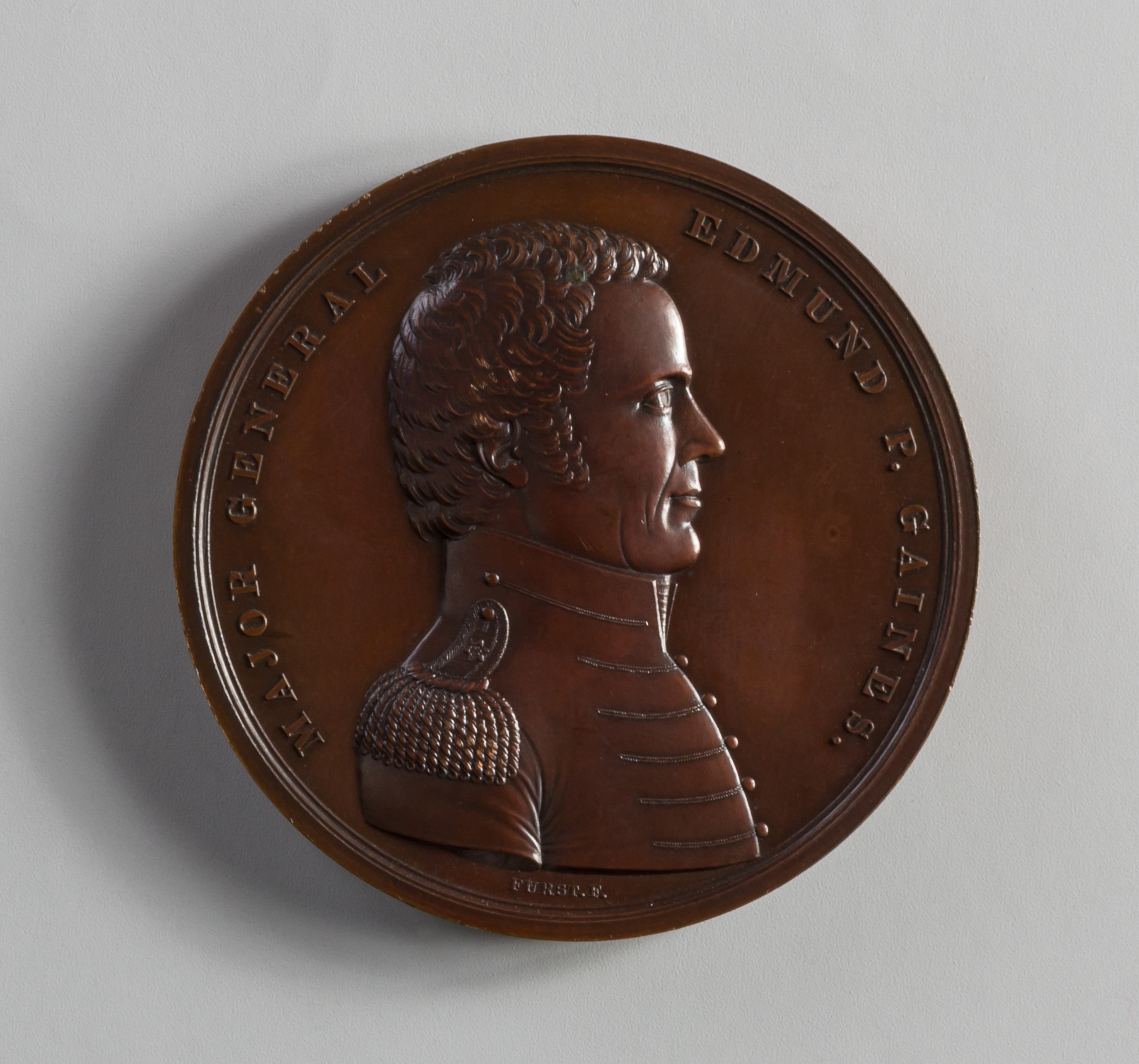
Bronze obverse of Congressional Gold Medal awarded to Gaines

== See also ==
- List of Congressional Gold Medal recipients
