= Sinking fund =

Setting aside revenue for capital expense or long-term debt

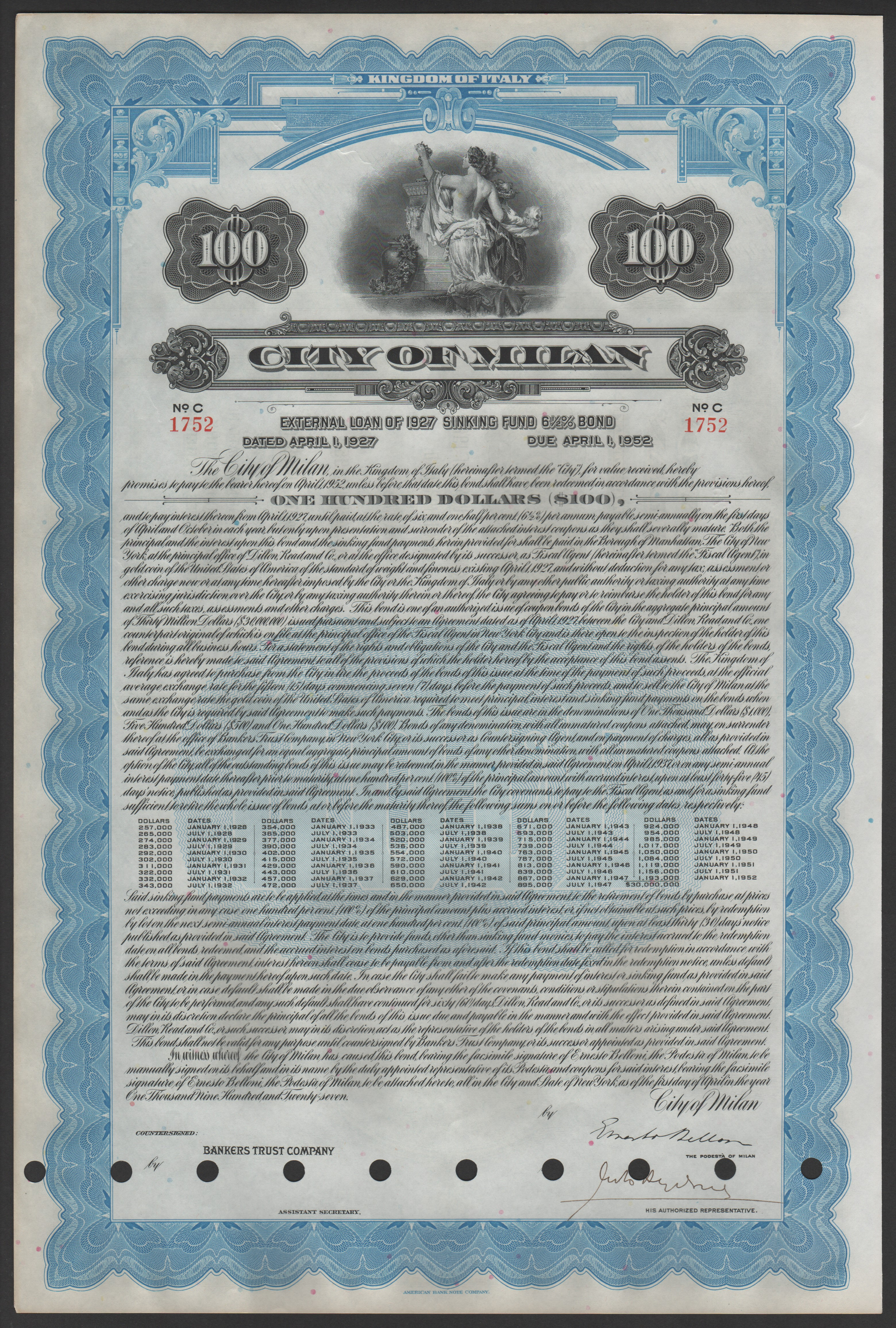
Sinking Fund bond of the City of Milan, issued 1 April 1927.

A sinking fund is a fund established by an economic entity by setting aside revenue over a period of time to fund a future capital expense, or repayment of a long-term debt.

In North America and elsewhere where it is common for government entities and private corporations to raise funds through the issue of bonds, the term is normally used in this context. However, in the United Kingdom and elsewhere where the issue of bonds (other than government bonds) is unusual, and where long-term leasehold tenancies are common, the term is only normally used in the context of replacement or renewal of capital assets, particularly the common parts of buildings.

== Historical context ==
=== Great Britain ===
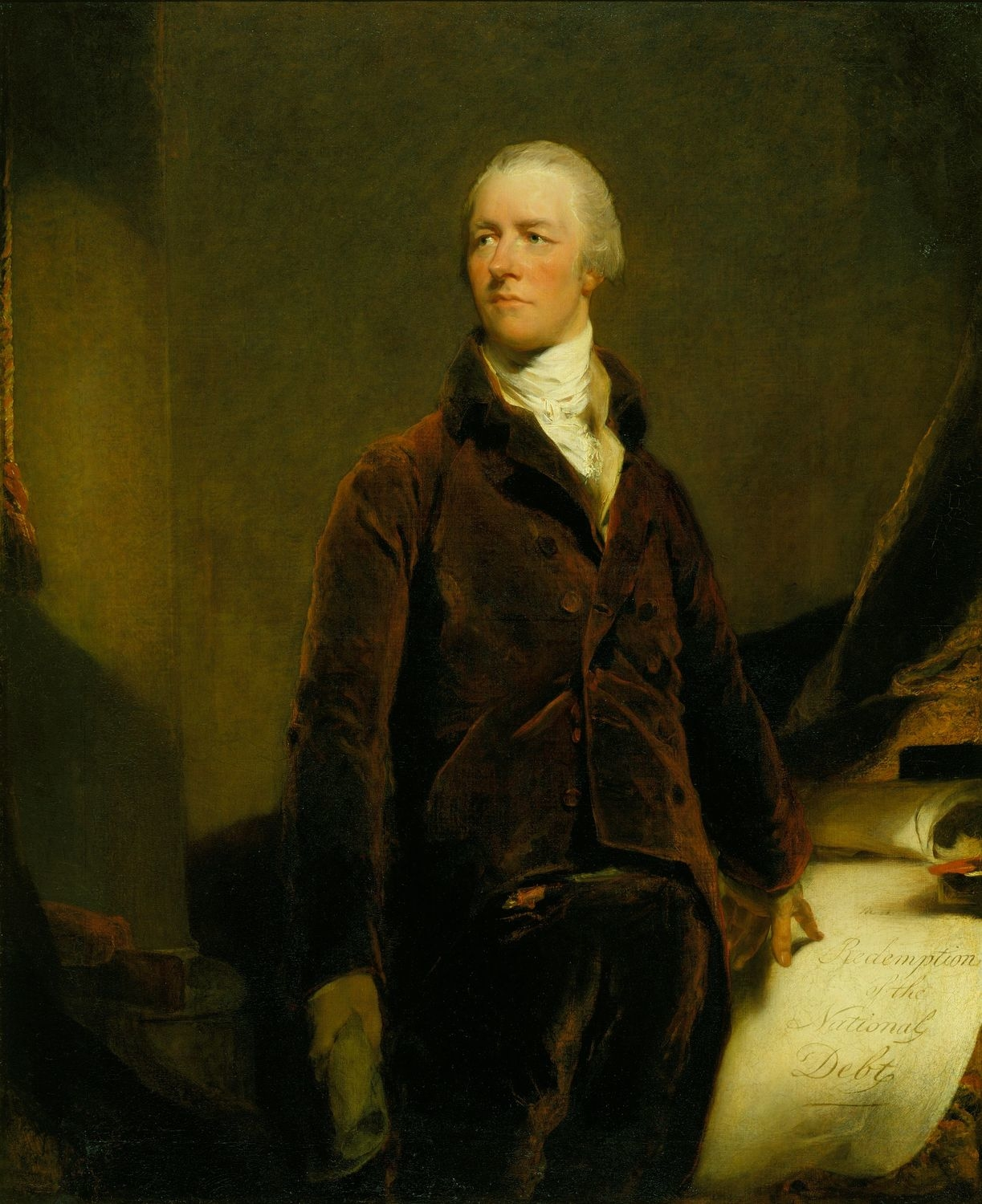
Portrait of William Pitt by Thomas Lawrence, 1807. Pitt is shown pointing to a document entitled Redemption of the National Debt.

The sinking fund was first used in Great Britain in the 18th century to reduce national debt. While used by Robert Walpole in 1716 and effectively in the 1720s and early 1730s, it originated in the commercial tax syndicates of the Italian peninsula of the 14th century, where its function was to retire redeemable public debt of those cities.

The fund received whatever surplus occurred in the national Budget each year. However, the problem was that the fund was rarely given any priority in government strategy. The result of this was that the funds were often raided by the Treasury when they needed funds quickly.

In 1772, the nonconformist minister Richard Price published a pamphlet on methods of reducing the national debt. The pamphlet caught the interest of William Pitt the Younger, who drafted a proposal to reform the Sinking Fund in 1786. Lord North recommended "the Creation of a Fund, to be appropriated, and invariably applied, under proper Direction, in the gradual Diminution of the Debt". Pitt's way of securing "proper Direction" was to introduce legislation that prevented ministers from raiding the fund in crises. He also increased taxes to ensure that a £1 million surplus could be used to reduce the national debt. The legislation also placed administration of the fund in the hands of "Commissioners for the Reduction of the National Debt".

The scheme worked well between 1786 and 1793 with the Commissioners receiving £8 million and reinvesting it to reduce the debt by more than £10 million. However, the outbreak of war with France in 1793 "destroyed the rationale of the Sinking Fund" (Eric Evans). The fund was abandoned by Lord Liverpool's government only in the 1820s.

=== United States ===
A federal Sinking Fund Commission was established by the 1st United States Congress.

Sinking funds were also seen commonly in investment in the 19th century in the United States, especially with highly invested markets like railroads. An example would be the Central Pacific Railroad Company, which challenged the constitutionality of mandatory sinking funds for companies in the case In re Sinking Funds Cases in 1878.

== Modern context – bond repayment ==
In modern finance, a sinking fund is, generally, a method by which an organization sets aside money over time to retire its indebtedness. More specifically, it is a fund into which money can be deposited, so that over time preferred stock, debentures or stocks can be retired. See also "sinking fund provision" under Bond (finance)#Features.

In some US states, Michigan for example, school districts may ask the voters to approve a taxation for the purpose of establishing a sinking fund. The State Treasury Department has strict guidelines for expenditure of fund dollars with the penalty for misuse being an eternal ban on ever seeking the tax levy again.

=== Types ===
A sinking fund may operate in one or more of the following ways:

1. The firm may repurchase a fraction of the outstanding bonds in the open market each year.
2. The firm may repurchase a fraction of outstanding bonds at a special call price associated with the sinking fund provision (they are callable bonds).
3. The firm has the option to repurchase the bonds at either the market price or the sinking fund price, whichever is lower. To allocate the burden of the sinking fund call fairly among bondholders, the bonds chosen for the call are selected at random based on serial number. The firm can only repurchase a limited fraction of the bond issue at the sinking fund price. At best some indentures allow firms to use a doubling option, which allows repurchase of double the required number of bonds at the sinking fund price.
4. A less common provision is to call for periodic payments to a trustee, with the payments invested so that the accumulated sum can be used for retirement of the entire issue at maturity: instead of the debt amortizing over the life, the debt remains outstanding and a matching asset accrues. In this way a fund is built up with the intention of paying off the debt in full at a specified future date instead of directly paying the debt down over time. This method was popular in the 1980s-90's in the UK household mortgage market.

=== Benefits and drawbacks ===
For the organization retiring debt, it has the benefit that the principal of the debt or at least part of it, will be available when due, so that the organization does not need to pay a large amount of money when due, and thus heavy disruption to the financial position of the organization can be avoided. For the creditors, the fund reduces the risk the organization will default due to financial hardship caused by the large payment, when the principal is due: it reduces credit risk.

However, if the bonds are callable, this comes at a cost to creditors, because the organization has an option on the bonds:

- The firm will choose to buy back discount bonds (selling below par) at their market price,
- while exercising its option to buy back premium bonds (selling above par) at par.

Therefore, if interest rates fall and bond prices rise, a firm will benefit from the sinking fund provision that enables it to repurchase its bonds at below-market prices. In this case, the firm's gain is the bondholder's loss – thus callable bonds will typically be issued at a higher coupon rate, reflecting the value of the option.

== Modern context – capital expenditure ==
Sinking funds can also be used to set aside money for purposes of replacing equipment as it becomes obsolete, or major maintenance or renewal of elements of a fixed asset, typically a building.

Historically, the term "sinking fund" was only used to refer to replacement of an asset and "reserve fund" was used for major maintenance or renewal. However, since the mid-2010s the terms are now used interchangeably in the United Kingdom.

=== Other applications ===
Though the term is often associated to business situations, it has gained popularity as a term people use when they use zero-based budgeting or cash envelope budgeting. In this application, the term "sinking fund" represents a type of category in a person's budget that they allocate money towards for future expenses including those that are long-term and short-term. Money is often allocated towards these sinking funds and can be taken out at any time.
