= Panic of 1792 =

Financial credit crisis in the United States

The Panic of 1792 was a financial credit crisis that occurred during the months of March and April 1792, precipitated by the expansion of credit by the newly formed Bank of the United States as well as by rampant speculation on the part of William Duer, Alexander Macomb, and other prominent bankers. Duer, Macomb, and their colleagues attempted to drive up prices of United States (U.S) debt securities and bank stocks, but when they defaulted on loans, prices fell, causing a bank run. Simultaneous tightening of credit by the Bank of the United States served to heighten the initial panic. Secretary of the Treasury Alexander Hamilton was able to deftly manage the crisis by providing banks across the Northeast United States with hundreds of thousands of dollars to make open-market purchases of securities, which allowed the market to stabilize by May 1792.

== Bank of the United States and the crisis of 1791 ==
In December 1790, Hamilton called for the creation of the Bank of the United States, and in February 1791, President George Washington signed the charter allowing it to open. Investors paid $25 for a stock, called a scrip, and were required to make three additional payments in six-month intervals totaling $375. These payments were to be 25% in specie and 75% in US debt securities. Demand for stock in the newly formed Bank of the United States was significant, and prices for scrips increased dramatically for the first several weeks, reaching $280 in New York and reportedly over $300 in Philadelphia by mid-August. The market shifts were not sustainable, and within days prices began to fall rapidly. Hamilton stepped in by working with William Seton, the cashier of the Bank of New York, to authorize the purchase of $150,000 of public debt in New York to be covered by government revenues. By September 12, prices had recovered, and Hamilton's intervention had not only stabilized the market but also laid the groundwork for his cooperation with the Bank of New York, which would later be crucial in ending the Panic of 1792.

== Causes of the Panic of 1792 ==
In late December 1791, the price of securities began to increase once again, and the eventual crash in March 1792 caused many investors to panic and withdraw their money from the Bank of the United States. One of the primary causes of the sudden run on the bank was the failure of a scheme created by William Duer, Alexander Macomb and other bankers in the winter of 1791. Duer and Macomb's plan was to use large loans to gain control of the US debt securities market because other investors needed those securities to make payments on stocks in the Bank of the United States. Additionally, Duer and Macomb were able to create their own credit by endorsing one another's notes, and did so in hopes of creating a new bank in New York to overtake the existing Bank of New York. On March 9, 1792 Duer stopped making payments to his creditors and simultaneously faced a lawsuit for actions he had taken as Secretary of the Treasury Board in the 1780s. As Duer and Macomb defaulted on their contracts and found themselves in prison, the price of securities fell more than 20%, all in a matter of weeks.

A further cause of the Panic of 1792 was the sudden restriction of previously overextended credit by the Bank of the United States. When the Bank of the United States first began accepting deposits and making discounts in December 1791, it expanded credit extensively. By January 31, 1792, monetary liabilities exceeded $2.17 million, and discounts reached $2.68 million – a very large sum at the time. Speculators took advantage of this new credit source, using it to make withdrawals from the Bank of New York, which placed undue stress on the bank's reserves. From December 29 to March 9, cash reserves for the Bank of the United States decreased by 34%, prompting the bank to not renew nearly 25% of its outstanding 30-day loans. This forced many Bank of the United States borrowers to sell other securities they owned to satisfy the un-renewed loans, which caused prices for these other investments to fall sharply, aggravating the financial panic of 1792.

== Crisis management ==
In mid-March 1792, Treasury Secretary Alexander Hamilton began the political and economic maneuvering necessary to contain the credit crisis affecting markets across the country. The charter creating the Bank of the United States had also set up the Sinking Fund Commission composed of Vice President John Adams, Secretary of State Thomas Jefferson, Attorney General Edmund Randolph, Chief Justice John Jay, and Secretary of the Treasury Alexander Hamilton, charged with resolving financial crises. On March 21, 1792, with Jay absent from voting, the commission split on the decision to allow open-market purchases. Having received notice from William Seton that the Bank of New York was in trouble, Hamilton wished to have the government make purchases as it had in 1791, but was unable to do so while Jefferson and Randolph stood opposed. While still waiting for Jay's formal and deciding vote, Randolph began to side with Hamilton on March 26, and with only Jefferson dissenting, the commission authorized $100,000 in open-market purchases of securities.

In a series of letters to Seton at the Bank of New York, Hamilton introduced several measures to restore normalcy to the securities market. Hamilton encouraged the bank to continue offering loans collateralized by US debt securities, but at a slightly increased rate of interest – seven percent instead of six. In order to persuade the Bank of New York to lend during the panic, Hamilton also promised that the US Treasury would buy from the bank up to $500,000 of securities should the Bank of New York be stuck with excessive collateral. Similarly, Hamilton supported the Bank of Maryland's lending by offering to have the US Treasury cover loans made to merchants paying duties. By April 16, after Hamilton authorized an additional $150,000 of open-market purchases by the Bank of New York, Seton reported that market demand was returning to normal.

In just under a month, Hamilton was thus able to stabilize the securities market and prevent the panic from inducing a recession. By exerting his power as Secretary of Treasury and persuading a number of banks to continue offering credit throughout the crisis, Hamilton was able to limit the amount of Federal debt purchases by the Sinking Fund Commission to $243,000 – roughly $100,000 less than what was spent during the smaller panic in 1791.

=== Analysis ===
Economists and economic historians have noted that Hamilton's management of the Panic of 1792 appears to have anticipated Henry Thornton by ten years and "Bagehot's Dictum" by approximately 80 years. This prescription, that in a crisis central banks should "lend freely, against good collateral, at a penalty rate" is still considered the gold standard for managing a financial panic as the "lender of last resort".

== See also ==
- Bibliography of Alexander Hamilton
- List of banking crises
