= William J. Hough =

United States Representative

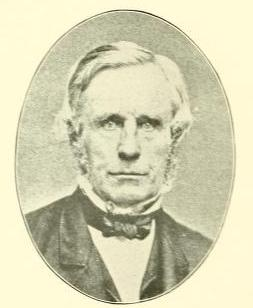
William J. Hough

William Jervis Hough (March 20, 1795 – October 4, 1869) was a United States representative from Cazenovia, Madison County, New York. He served one term in Congress from 1845 to 1847.

== Life ==
William Jervis Hough was born in Paris Hill, Oneida County, New York, as recorded in the New York State Census for 1795. His parents were Benjamin Hough and Mercy Jervis. They moved to Pompey Hill, Onondaga County and William attended school at the "Academy" in Pompey Hill.

William Jervis Hough completed preparatory studies for jurisprudence in Cazenovia and passed the bar as a lawyer. He read law in the office of Childs & Stebbins and was admitted about 1820. ( History of Chenango and Madison Counties - Chapter 51)

=== Family ===
Hough married Clarinda Carpenter in Cazenovia in 1821. They moved to Lyons, Ontario (now Wayne County), NY. Their son, William Jerome Hough, was born there in 1821. Mr. W.J. Hough opened his law practice in Lyons and stayed until 1828 when he returned to Cazenovia. (Records in the First Presbyterian Church of Cazenovia.) He practiced law in Cazenovia, Madison County, NY until 1855 when the Hough family moved to Syracuse, Onondaga County, NY, (US Census for 1855, Syracuse 4th Ward, Syracuse, NY)

William and Clarinda Hough had two daughters in addition to their son. William Jerome Hough married Margaret Seymour in Cazenovia. Helen Clarinda Hough was born 28 May 1837 and married Charles E. Stevens, an attorney in Syracuse, NY. Frances Jervis Hough was born the 6th of December 1826 and married Matthew Joseph Myers. M. J Myers became a banker and telephone business entrepreneur in Syracuse. The telephone company run by M. J. Myers and Son was called the American District Telegraph Company. They already managed the telegraph company when they had the opportunity to sublet the Syracuse license from H.C Brower & Son. (1880 US Census, Syracuse, NY)

=== State legislature and Congress ===
While living in Cazenovia, Hough was elected and served as a member of the Assembly in 1835 and 1836. (New York State Records for Madison County Proceedings). Elected as a Democrat, he served as Representative of the 23rd district for Cazenovia in the Twenty-ninth United States Congress from 1845 to 1847. (Biography for US Congressmen). While working on a bill concerning the creation of the Smithsonian Institution, he became an acting Regent and assisted in the plans for the first administrative building, called the Castle. A portrait of Hough and his family is displayed in the Smithsonian's National Portrait Gallery. (Smithsonian Archives)

While living in Cazenovia, Hough participated in the New York State militia, serving with the 8th Cavalry Regiment and becoming a General.

=== Smithsonian ===
While serving in the US Congress, he was a member of the committee that managed the construction of a building for the new Smithsonian Institution, and he served as a member of the Institution's Board of Regents. Hough was secretary for the first meetings of the regents and also a member of the Smithsonian Building Committee. He attended the first meeting of the Board of Regents in the fall of 1846.

Quoting from archives: "These papers consist of Hough's correspondence with David Dale Owen concerning the selection of stones for the Smithsonian Building and an original proposal for the Smithsonian Building from the architect, James Renwick, Jr. They also contain notes regarding the 1846 founding of the Smithsonian Institution; a report by the Smithsonian Building Committee; notes from contractors; and an 1863 newspaper article about the Smithsonian Building. (The New York Observer, January 29, 1863)

=== Later career ===
In Syracuse, Hough served as Vice-President for the old Syracuse City Bank. His law partner in Syracuse, NY was Samuel H. Edwards of Buffalo, NY (May 10, 1868, Journal) He was also president of the Board of Education for two terms. (Syracuse Board of Education Records.) He took great interest in the incorporating and laying out of Oakwood Cemetery (Syracuse, New York), and was among its first Board of Directors. ("Honoring the Founders of the Cemetery" by Fred S. Hills, 1894)

=== Death and burial ===
William Jervis Hough died October 4, 1869, in Syracuse, New York and was buried in the Oakwood Cemetery.

U.S. House of Representatives
Preceded by Orville Robinson	Member of the U.S. House of Representatives from New York's 23rd congressional district 1845–1847	Succeeded by William Duer
