= Hannah Bunce Watson =

American newspaper publisher (1749–1807)

Hannah Bunce Watson Hudson (28 December 1749 – 27 September 1807) was a newspaper publisher from the U.S. state of Connecticut, whose printed output supported the American Revolutionary War. She was the first woman to become a newspaper editor in Connecticut, and one of the first in the United States.

== Biography ==
In December, 1777, before George Washington had become the first President of the United States, and while Jonathan Trumbull was Governor of Connecticut, the newspapers in Boston, Massachusetts that supported the Revolution had been shut down by the British, and in New York City only pro-British Tory papers were being published. The Connecticut Courant, then the oldest and largest newspaper in the Thirteen Colonies with a circulation of 8,000, remained open. In December of that year the owner and publisher, Ebenezer Watson, died of smallpox. His widow, Hannah Bunce Watson, already caring for five children under the age of 7 and with little printing training, took on the additional burden of publishing the Courant. She made the Courant employee George Goodwin a business partner, and used the paper to support the war effort against the British.

The paper supplied battle descriptions from the colonies, news and analysis of Colonial and British home events, and criticisms of the British Parliament. Excluding advertising and short local items, the paper carried only nine non-political articles during this period.

In January 1778, Tory supporters set fire to the mill that provided paper to the Courant, and Watson and Goodwin announced its imminent closure. The day after the fire, Watson and Goodwin printed a "half sheet" edition of the paper. Then "she and the widow [Sarah] Ledyard, co-owner of the mill, petitioned Connecticut's legislature...for a loan to rebuild the mill." Within a day, the Connecticut General Assembly authorized the establishment of a state lottery to support the rebuilding of the mill, and the Courant maintained publication without interruption.

In 1779 Watson married Barzillai Hudson, who took over her share of the printing business, and in 1837 the Connecticut Courant became the daily Hartford Courant, which is today the largest daily newspaper in Connecticut.

She was inducted into the Connecticut Women's Hall of Fame in 1994.

== Personal life ==
Hannah Bunce was the daughter of Aaron and Hannah Bunce. She was born in Hartford, Connecticut, on 28 December 1749. She became the second wife of Ebenezer Watson in 1771. After his death, she married a second time to Barzillai Hudson in 1779. (Note: They had four children: Henry, Olive, Lavinia, and Hannah. Henry married Maria Trumbull and later became the mayor of Hartford, Connecticut.) She died 27 September 1807 in Hartford.
