= Myra Clark Gaines =

American socialite and plaintiff (1804–1885)

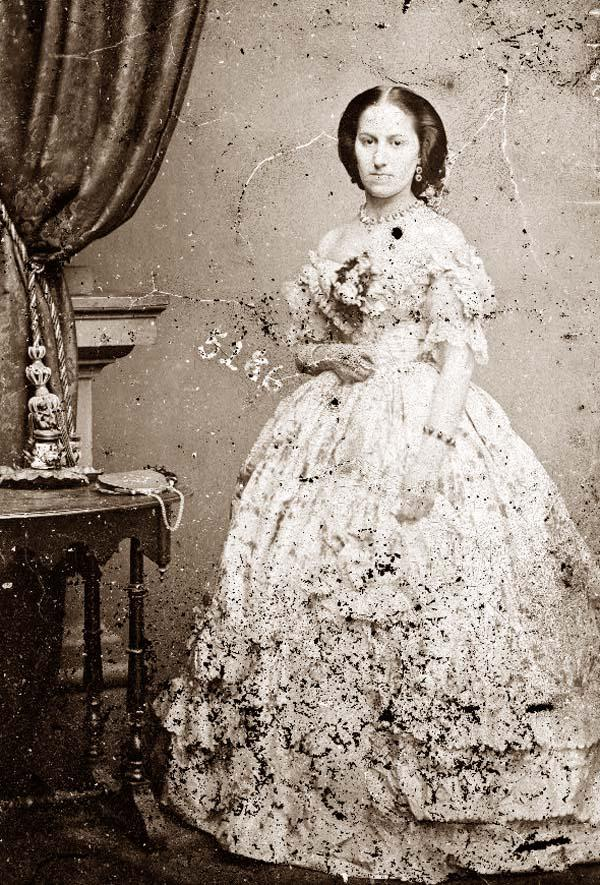
- Born: June 5, 1805
- Died: January 9, 1885 (aged 79); New Orleans, Louisiana
- Spouses: William Wallace Whitney (m. 1832; died 1837) Edmund Pendleton Gaines (m. 1839; died 1849)
- Parent(s): Daniel Clark; Zulime Carrière

Myra Clark Gaines (June 5, 1805 – January 9, 1885) was an American socialite and plaintiff in the longest-running lawsuit in the history of the United States court system. From 1834 to 1891, Gaines was at the center of a legal battle to recognize her legal status as the sole heir of her deceased father's estate and remedy to recover valuable land in New Orleans. During its 57-year history in the courtroom, the Gaines cases appeared before the Supreme Court seventeen times and the Louisiana state and federal court at least seventy times. The Gaines cases are notable not only because of their length and complexity but also due to the controversial image and perseverance of Myra Clark Gaines herself, particularly at a time when women were confined to a domestic, dutiful ideal of femininity.

== Family and early life ==
Gaines was born to a mercantile businessman Daniel Clark and French socialite Zulime Carrière. During his lifetime, Clark was considered one of the richest and most influential men of New Orleans. Originally from Ireland, Clark was named after his uncle, Daniel Clark Sr., another very successful businessman, who immigrated to New Orleans in the 1770s. After years of paying for his nephew's education, Clark Sr. eventually invited him to take part in his business ventures in New Orleans. Against his parents' will, Clark accepted his uncle's offer and moved to the United States in 1787 at the age of twenty. Once there, Clark built up a decent fortune running his uncle's mercantile house and investing those profits in New Orleans real estate. Aside from his various commercial projects, Clark also had ambitious political aspirations. Although Clark ultimately secured an official appointment as the vice consul to New Orleans from President Thomas Jefferson in 1801, he was unsuccessful in obtaining an appointment for the governorship of Louisiana.

While Clark was a well-known figure of society, much less is known about Gaines's mother. Born in Louisiana in 1781, Carrière was an attractive woman from a modest upbringing. At thirteen, she entered her first marriage with Frenchman Jerome DesGrange, who, at forty years old, described himself as a "wealthy nobleman. Carrière then met Clark through her husband, who had an ongoing business partnership with him. In 1802, once a relationship had already developed between Carrière and Clark, Gaines claimed that the two were secretly married because Carrière was still married to DesGrange. It was further alleged that Carrière's marriage to DesGrange was illegal because he was a bigamist who had several wives before moving to New Orleans. Indeed, records showed that an ecclesiastical court condemned and arrested DesGrange for bigamy. As a result, in 1806, Carrière left Philadelphia where she and Clark resided for New Orleans to find enough proof to annul her first marriage. Still, the circumstances that ended her first marriage are somewhat contested since a transcript of Carrière's testimony to an ecclesiastical court reveals that she did not believe DesGrange was a bigamist.

Whatever may have been the truth, Carrière's relationship with Clark also began to crumble around this time. In Carrière's absence, Clark courted another socialite, Louisa Caton, granddaughter of Charles Carroll, one of the signers of the Declaration of Independence. According to Gaines, Clark destroyed every document proving his marriage to Carrière in order to marry Caton. The other reported reasons for their separation included rumors of Carrière's infidelity while Clark was in Washington working as Louisiana's territorial legislator as well as Clark's fears that his clandestine marriage threatened his political aspirations. By the time Carrière and Clark separated, Gaines was an infant and put in the care of Clark's close friend, Colonel Samuel Davis and his wife Marian.

Gaines had some interaction with her parents once she moved in with the Davis family. Clark often visited her as a child and provided some financial support. However, at the time of his death in 1813, he never publicly acknowledged his paternity. Gaines did not receive much more support from her mother. After the break-up of her second marriage, Carrière married prominent dentist Dr. James Gardette and had other children. Her visits became more infrequent as Gaines got older, though both were in cordial contact later in life and until her death in 1853. Still, Carrière stayed away enough to never appear as a witness during any of Gaines' trials.

Once the War of 1812 began, the Davis family and Gaines left New Orleans and migrated to Philadelphia. Making a new life up North, Gaines was also never told about her real father's identity or her close ties to New Orleans.

== Investigation into a lost will ==
When Colonel Davis first learned of Clark's death, he contacted Clark's executors, Richard Relf and Beverly Chew to know if Clark had left anything for Gaines. Relf and Chew, however, affirmed that Clark's last will ("the 1811 will") named his mother, Mary Clark, as his only heir. According to Davis, Gaines learned about the will and her father's identity in 1830 when she supposedly found correspondence from Clark that acknowledged her as his daughter. Davis confessed the truth upon her discovery of these letters. Other evidence puts into doubt this chain of events, but regardless Gaines never asked Davis to make further demands upon Relf and Chew or attempted to write them on her own behalf.

Circumstances and familial relationships changed after Gaines' marriage to a young lawyer named William Wallace Whitney in 1832. Davis had a strained relationship with Whitney and did not approve of Gaines' marriage to him for unconfirmed reasons, though it somehow involved Clark's estate. Over time, Gaines became more distant from Davis, whom she only referred as "the Colonel" in her correspondence.

Her relationship with the Colonel did not improve once she and Whitney decided to pursue the information found in the various correspondences between Davis and Clark. After locating and visiting Clark's old friends and residents who knew Clark, Gaines and Whitney confirmed that Clark had made a second will right before his death ("the 1813 will") that recognized Gaines as his legitimate child and heir. Under the will of 1813, Clark left Gaines his entire estate less several minor inheritances.

Following this investigation, Whitney filed a preliminary lawsuit in February 1834 to contest the validity of the 1811 will in the Eastern District Court of Louisiana. In the beginning, Gaines's lawsuits were filed by Whitney because, for most of the nineteenth century, women had no legal standing before U.S. courts. Thus, Gaines could only fight for her inheritance on behalf of her husband's name. Although Louisiana followed civil law, which gave women more flexibility and power in controlling their own property, Gaines's claims were primarily filed in U.S. federal courts.

The preliminary suit went after Clark's executors, Relf and Chew, accusing them of fraudulent mismanagement of Clarks's estate assets. The specific claims alleged Relf and Chew had acted fraudulently by pretending that Clark endorsed to them a loan made to Davis. Another claim also accused Relf and Chew of destroying the 1813 will that left most of Clark's fortune to Gaines. In response, the executors denied the allegations and further argued that Clark had never been married to Carrière, had no legitimate descendants, and left his estate to his mother. Additionally, they presented evidence that Mary Clark granted power of attorney to Relf and Chew to act on her behalf in all matters that related to Clark's estate. Finally, they explained that managing Clark's estate was complicated as a result of defective land titles.

A few months later, in December 1834, Federal District Court judge Samuel Harper ruled in this preliminary suit in favor of Relf and Chew. Adding to the couple's loss, Relf and Chew filed a libel suit against Whitney that was also successful. Whitney was convicted of criminal libel and sentenced to prison for a month.

== Great Gaines lawsuits ==
Despite the setbacks, Gaines and Whitney were not deterred in moving forward with their claims. On June 18, 1834, Whitney initiated the first of a long chain of lawsuits on behalf of Gaines: W.W. Whitney v. Eleanor O'Bearn, et al. This new suit asked the Court of Probates of New Orleans to declare Gaines the true heir of the 1813 will and order Relf and Chew to transfer all property belonging to Clark's estate to Gaines. The defendants named in the suit were the heirs of Mary Clark, including daughter Eleanor O'Bearn, as well as Relf and Chew.

The Gaines case posed a serious threat to not only the named defendants but to the dozens of property owners in New Orleans. Indeed, over the last twenty years since Clark's death, Relf and Chew had sold property from Clark's estate to various third parties. Many of these transactions involved the executors and prominent figures of New Orleans society. In effect, the case claimed title to their plantations, hundreds of slaves, bank deposits, bank stocks, rents, and profits from Clark's properties. Over the course of subsequent suits, the couple widened the scope of their litigation to include as defendants at least twenty-five purchasers of property from Clark's estate.

Whitney offered as witnesses two of Clark's close confidants. First, Harriet Harper Smythe, the nurse who cared for Gaines as an infant, testified about the contents of the 1813 will, which Clark signed only a month before his death. Clark's friend Colonel Joseph Bellechasse also confirmed the existence of the 1813 will and recalled how Clark had confessed that Gaines was his legitimate daughter and heir. The defense's answer was similar to the arguments presented in the prior suit and would continue to be used in the suits that followed: Clark and Carrière were never legally married; Clark had no legitimate children; the 1811 will was the only will Clark made; and if there was a subsequent will, Clark had gotten rid of it himself.

At the center of the litigation was the question of whether there existed a legal marriage between Gaines's parent, Daniel Clark and Zulime Carrière. The testimony at trial explained that Clark's primary motivation for keeping a clandestine marriage was to protect his political hope of becoming Louisiana's governor. Against this view was evidence of Carrière's subsequent marriage to Gardette, which complicated the claim that there existed a valid marriage between her and Clark. However, there was such scant records or letters on this issue that each side was able to twist the finding to fit their own argument.

Outside of the contested legal issues, Gaines and Whitney faced other types of challenges in the courtroom. In presenting their case in New Orleans courts, the couple, who were not fluent in French, had to navigate through complicated courtroom procedures that continued to heavily rely on the use of the French language. For example, when an argument was presented in English, French-speaking jurors were excused from the jury box. Similarly, English-speaking jurors were removed from the jury box whenever it was time to listen to the French counsel. As a result, the jurors had to come up with a verdict based on an incomplete record when a case involved both French- and English-speaking litigants.

Another significant challenge for Gaines and Whitney was New Orleans's adoption of civil law over British common law. All U.S. federal courts and every other state except Louisiana followed the common law by this time. Courts that practiced the common law also traditionally applied equity law. By contrast, as a civil law state, Louisiana did not adopt equity jurisprudence. Under the law of equity, courts had the flexibility of remedying any defects in the common law to reflect the genuine intentions of the parties involved. Although the couple filed their suits mostly in federal courts, the Louisiana federal district judge refused to hear their petitions at equity. Instead, the judge based his decision on the family and property law provisions of the Louisiana Civil Code of 1825. In another loss, Gaines and Whitney were refused recognition of the 1813 will and revocation of the probate granted to the 1811 will.

Gaines and Whitney favored equity practice because it was of particular importance in cases such as theirs that involved fraud, mistake, or forgery. Equity, for example, allowed the couple to ask the judge to force the defendants to answer her petition through a writ of subpoena, which also made it possible for her case to come to trial. Thus, the judge's ruling was a surprising blow to the case, especially since the general custom of Louisiana federal courts was to allow both equity and common law practice. Still, the Louisiana judges that heard Gaines' earlier cases often revealed their lack of impartiality by making these types of exceptions to the rules of practice.

A few years into what would be decades of litigation, Gaines overcame another significant obstacle: the unexpected death of Whitney. He died from a yellow fever epidemic that hit New Orleans in 1837. His death was sudden and unexpected, succumbing to the illness after only three days. Gaines, as a result of his passing, was pushed into serious financial difficulties. Most of Whitney's personal fortune went into the legal expenditures for Gaines's cases. In spite of economic strain, Gaines chose not only to pursue the lawsuits but also to file them under her own name. By 1848, more federal courts practicing under the common law were adopting the Married Women's Property Act, which protected the inherited property and money of married women.

In Ex parte Whitney (1839), Gaines petitioned and appeared before the Supreme Court for the first time to demand that the Louisiana federal district judge adjudicate her case according to the rules of equity practice. Specifically, the Court was asked to issue a writ of mandamus to the judge compelling him to proceed with the case. In crafting Gaines's argument, her attorneys appealed to sentimental conceptions of women held by the male judges. Gaines's lawyers portrayed her as an injured orphan, betrayed by the conniving male executors of Clark's estate. Although Justice Story and the Court were not moved by the dramatic events of Gaines's life, they did conclude the Louisiana judge allow her case to be tried at equity.

Gaines finally argued her case in front of a trial in Barnes v. Gaines (1843), a suit filed in a Louisiana District Court by Gaines's alleged half-sister, Caroline Barnes. At issue was Gaines's unlawful possession of a land under Clark's estate. The case took an unexpected turn when her attorney withdrew from the courtroom after an argument with the judge. Gaines, consequently, argued her own claims in front of the jury at the risk of losing another suit. During the nineteenth century, her move was almost unprecedented since judges typically refused that women act even as witnesses. The accepted view was that women were less able to speak rationally or reasonably as compared to men. Gaines, however, took the opportunity to act as her own attorney and demonstrate her command over the intricacies of her claims. Barnes became the first victory ever for any Gaines case. In light of the intense public scrutiny over the trial, the judge refused to grant Barnes a new trial and be forced to conduct an extraordinary search for an unbiased jury.

After her win in Louisiana court, Gaines found more success in her subsequent appearances before the Supreme Court. By the time the Court heard Patterson v. Gaines (1848), it had already determined that Gaines had a cause of action. Gaines argued she was Clark's legitimate heir not only under the 1813 will but also the 1811 will, which was the only will the court probated. Charles Patterson, purchaser of a portion of Clark's land, contested her claims in the suit where the issue hinged on whether Gaines was Clark's legitimate child. Under Louisiana's Civil Code, a father could not disinherit a legitimate child; no more than one-fifth of an estate could be willed away from his children. Thus, it was not necessary for Gaines to be named in the 1811 will. As Clark's legitimate child, Gaines was due four-fifths of his estate. However, an "adulterous bastard" was not a legitimate child under the Code. Adulterous bastards were children conceived "from an unlawful connection" by two persons who were either or both married to someone else. In other words, if Carrière's prior marriage was valid, then Gaines was an adulterous bastard and not a claimant under the 1811 will since her union with Clark was bigamous. Fortunately for Gaines, bigamy was hard to prove, considering how lax communities were in maintaining marriage records. In upholding the circuit court's ruling in favor of Gaines, the Supreme Court wielded its equitable powers to sort and evaluate through significant amounts of testimony, wills, land transactions, and documents.

Justice James Wayne's opinion in Patterson demonstrated the majority's desire to provide more legal protections to families, women, and children. Any suspicions raised against her parents' marriage could not strip Gaines of any presumption of legitimacy, according to Wayne. His opinion further held that Relf and Chew had no authority under the 1811 will to sell any property from Clark's estate, that their role as executors had ended, and that the deeds they issued were void. However, as was typical in the course of Gaines's lawsuits, her victory was short-lived. In Gaines v. Relf and Chew (1852), the Court reversed its ruling in Patterson in light of new evidence that disputed Gaines's legitimacy. John Archibald Campbell was the attorney for Gaines in the Supreme Court case of 1852.

Gaines's most important victory came in 1858 when the Louisiana Supreme Court admitted Clark's 1813 will to probate. Upon Gaines's return to the Supreme Court in 1860 and again 1867, the Court finally declared Gaines to be the legitimate child and only heir of Daniel Clark. By this time, the reported value of the properties Gaines had claims over but did not yet control topped $35 million of prime New Orleans real estate. However, Gaines's challengers fiercely defended the property they had purchased, and none proved to be more difficult than the City of New Orleans.

== Aftermath of trials ==
The Supreme Court issued its final ruling on the Gaines case in City of New Orleans v. Whitney (1891). Six years after Gaines' death, the Court ordered the city of New Orleans to pay her estate $923,788. Before this decision, the city had been contesting the decrees from both the U.S. and Louisiana Supreme Court that awarded damages and the contested property to Gaines. Although the city lost the courtroom battle, the Gaines family did not fare much better. Gaines's creditors quickly filed claims with the administrators of her estate for repayment of attorney fees and loans. After deducting more than $860,000 in prior debts and legal expenses, Gaines's heirs were left with a small fraction of the original settlement.

== Popularity and media coverage ==
Gaines's plight in the courtroom led to extensive media coverage that propelled her into a celebrity status that few women had in the late nineteenth century. A popular series of books during that time, for example, published a novel inspired by her life and the romance between Clark and Carrière called Myra: The Child of Adoption, A Romance in Real Life.

Philadelphia, New York, and New Orleans newspapers also published recurring stories on Gaines and her lawsuits. However, the relationship the litigants had with the media was a mutually beneficial one. From the beginning, the parties took their claims to newspapers, which would publish their story but not without its own commentary. Immediately, New Orleans papers were in firm support of Relf and Chew while Gaines received a strong backing from the Northern press. The Southern papers often questioned Gaines's true motivations and praised Relf and Chew's determination to rise above any speculation. On the other hand, the Northern papers were moved by elements of romance and tragedy marking Gaines's life, often referring to her case as the cause of an injured orphan.

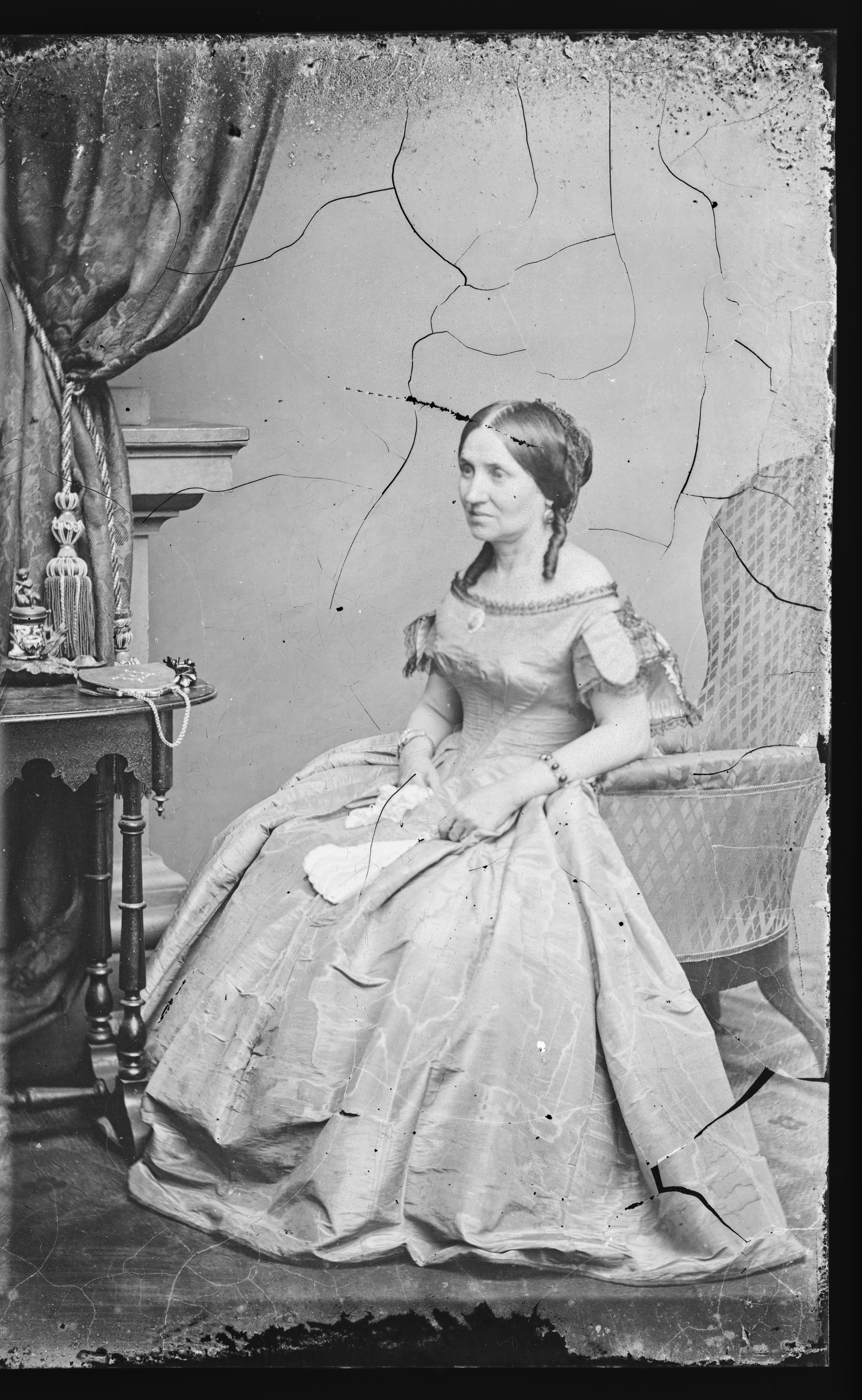
Myra Clark Gaines sits for a portrait at the Mathew Brady Photography Studio c. 1860-1870.

Several factors helped intensify the spotlight on Gaines's lawsuits. First, a number of the suits were litigated by some of the most famous lawyers in the country. Litigators like Daniel Webster, John A. Campbell, Francis Scott Key and Reverdy Johnson all ensured that her case remained in the front pages of the news. Second, Gaines garnered significant attention from her second marriage in 1839 to war hero General Edmund Pendleton Gaines. In fact, the General's courtship of then Myra Clark Whitney made national headlines. At the time they married, the General was known as the "Hero of Fort Erie" from his victories in the War of 1812 and celebrated in various states with medals for bravery. The marriage proved successful not only in bringing more attention to her case but also in alleviating much of the financial burden from her cases. Like Whitney, the General also contributed most of his wealth to defending Gaines's claims.

Gaines became a famous yet controversial figure just as much for her appearances outside the courtroom. In 1840, Gaines set out with the General on an extensive lecture tour throughout the Atlantic to discuss his plan of national defense, which promoted the use of floating batteries over fleets of steam-powered warships. In support of the General, Gaines spoke after him about the horrors of war to packed town halls in St. Louis, Cincinnati, New York City, Baltimore, and Philadelphia. Her decision to speak contravened the common view that women could not be taken seriously in a public forum. While the lectures were also a way to keep the public eye on her lawsuits, she was also outspoken about other legal causes such as the post-Civil War campaign for women's suffrage. Gaines's celebrity status finally reached its zenith in the 1860s.

Many documents such as personal letters & case letters, photographs & family history, are currently preserved at the Howard-Tilton Memorial Library on Tulane University's campus in the Special Collections department. This collection is a compilation of personal letters, newspaper clippings, and case records regarding the Myra Clark Gaines case.

== Death ==
After General Gaines' death in 1849, Mrs Gaines did not remarry. She died on January 9, 1885, in New Orleans due to pneumonia and lung congestion. Even though, by this time, Mrs Gaines had retreated from the media limelight, her death was widely covered by national newspapers.

== List of Supreme Court Cases ==
- Ex Parte Myra Clark Whitney, 13 Peters 404 (1837)
- Edmund P. Gaines and Wife v. Richard Relf, Beverly Chew, et al., 15 Peters 9 (1841)
- Edmund P. Gaines et ux. V. Beverly Chew, Richard Relf, et al., 2 Howard 619 (1844)
- Charles Patterson v. Edmund P. Gaines, et ux., 6 Howard 550 (1848)
- Myra Clark Gaines v. Richard Relf and Beverly Chew, Executors, et al., 12 Howard 472 (1852)
- Myra Clark Gaines v. Duncan N. Hennen, 24 Howard 553 (1861)
- Myra Clark Gaines v. The City of New Orleans et al., 6 Wallace 642 (1868)
- Myra Clark Gaines v. F. De La Croix, et al., 6 Wallace 719 (1868)
- Myra Clark Gaines v. Manuel J Lizardi, et al., 6 Wallace 723 (1868)
- City of New Orleans v. Myra Clark Gaines, 82 U.S. 624 (1873)
- Myra Clark Gaines v. Joseph Fuentes, et al., 92 U.S. 10 (1876)
- Samuel Smith, James E. Zunts et al., v. Myra Clark Gaines, 93 U.S. 341 (1876)
- Eliza Davis v. Myra Clark Gaines, 104 U.S. 386 (1881)
- City of New Orleans v. James Y. Christmas, et al., 131 U.S. 191 (1889)
- City of New Orleans v. James Y. Christmas and Hattie L. Whitney, Administrators of the Succession of Myra Clark Gaines, 131 U.S. 220 (1889)
- City of New Orleans v. William Wallace Whitney, Administrator of the Succession of Myra Clark Gaines, and William Wallace Whitney, Administrator of the Succession of Myra Clark Gaines v. *City of New Orleans, 138 U.S. 595 (1891)

== List of Louisiana Supreme Court Cases ==
- Barnes v. Gaines, 5 Rob. 314 (1843)
- Succession of Clark, 11 La. Ann. 124 (1856)
- Clark's Heirs v. Gaines, 13 La. Ann. 138 (1858)
- De la Croix v. Gaines, 13 La. Ann. 177 (1858)
- Van Wych v. Gaines, 13 La. Ann. 235 (1858)
- Fuentes v. Gaines, 25 La. Ann. 85 (1873)
- Foulhouze v. Gaines, 26 La. Ann. 84 (1874)

== Bibliography ==
- Alexander, Elizabeth Urban (2001), Notorious Woman: The Celebrated Case of Myra Clark Gaines, Baton Rouge: Louisiana State University Press, ISBN 978-0-8071-2698-1
- Collins, Kristin A. (2005), "Federalism's Fallacy: The Early Tradition of Federal Family Law and the Invention of States' Rights", Cardozo Law Review, 26: 1815–1842
- Harmon, Nolan J. (1946), The Famous Case of Myra Clark Gaines, Baton Rouge: Louisiana State University Press
- Kane, Harnett Thomas (1948), New Orleans Woman, Garden City, New Jersey: Sun Dial Press
- Plunkett, Anna Clyde (2007), Corridors by Candlelight, Kessinger Publishing, ISBN 978-0-548-05959-3
- Wohl, Michael (1984), A Man in the Shadow: The Life of Daniel Clark (Ph.D.), Tulane University
