= Silver Mount Cemetery =

Cemetery on Staten Island, New York, US

Coordinates: 40°37′19″N 74°05′44″W

Silver Mount Cemetery is located at 918 Victory Boulevard on Staten Island, New York, United States. It was originally named Cooper Cemetery around 1866. It covers about 17 acres.

== Notable burials ==
- William Duer (1805–1879), US Congressman
- Kelvin Martin (1964–1987), known to the underworld as 50 Cent; New York City criminal known as the supposed inspiration for the name of the famous rapper, 50 Cent
- Mary Ewing Outerbridge (1852–1886), who imported tennis into the US
- Trixie Smith (1885–1943), singer during the classic female blues period
- Wallace Thurman (1902–1934), writer
- Fay Tincher (1884–1983), actress
- William Winter (1836–1917), American dramatic critic and author
