= Edward B. Judson =

American politician and banker

Member of the New York State Assembly for Oswego
- In office January 1, 1841 – December 31, 1841 Serving with William Duer
- Preceded by: Peter Devendorf; William Duer
- Succeeded by: Peter Devendorf; Robert C. Kenyon
- In office January 1, 1839 – December 31, 1839 Serving with Samuel Hawley
- Preceded by: Arvin Rice; John M. Richardson
- Succeeded by: Peter Devendorf; William Duer

Personal details
- Born: Edward Barker Judson; January 11, 1813 Coxsackie, New York
- Died: January 15, 1902 (aged 89) Syracuse, New York
- Party: Whig
- Spouse: Sarah Billings Williams (m. 1845)

Edward Barker Judson (January 11, 1813 – January 15, 1902) was an American politician and banker who served as president of the First National Bank of Syracuse.

== Early life ==
Judson was born on January 11, 1813, at Coxsackie in Greene County, New York.

== Career ==
At the age of twenty-one, Judson went into the lumber business in Constantia, New York. In 1849, he became a resident of Syracuse, New York, and was made vice president of the Merchants' Bank. In 1855, he organized the Lake Ontario Bank of Oswego. He was "summoned to Washington" by Secretary Salmon P. Chase for consultation and, later, organized the First National Bank of Syracuse, becoming its first president. He also served as chairman of the executive committee of the National Banking Association from 1864 to 1875.

He also served as a director of the New York Central Railroad and of the American Express Company. He was a trustee of Wells College and of the May Memorial Church where he was a member.

=== Political career ===
Judson served in the New York State Assembly in 1839 and again in 1841, as a Whig, in the 62nd and 64th New York State Legislatures alongside William Duer.

== Personal life ==
In 1845, Judson was married to Sarah Billings Williams (1823–1903), a daughter of Coddington Billings Williams and Sarah (née Smith) Williams. Together, they were the parents of:

- Russell Judson, who died in infancy.
- Henry Heermance Judson, who died in infancy.
- Edward Barker Judson Jr. (1854–1910), who Harriet Elmendorf (1855–1919), a daughter of the Rev. Dr. Joachim Elmendorf, in 1886.

Judson died on January 15, 1902, at 612 James Street, his residence in Syracuse and was buried in Oakwood Cemetery in Syracuse. His wife died the following year on September 23, 1903.
