= Sinking Fund Commission =

American government agency (1790–1836)

The Sinking Fund Commission was a sinking fund commission that was created on August 12, 1790, by the United States Congress to control the disbursement of funds that Congress had already allocated to repay the national debt. The commission was composed of five members: the President of the Senate, the Secretary of State, the Chief Justice, the Secretary of the Treasury, and the Attorney General. The board members voted to make purchases of the national debt using surplus from import taxes. If at least three board members said yes, or a majority if not all the board members were present, the President had to approve the purchase. After a few years of existence, the Secretary of the Treasury started to make all the decisions. For some time after that, the Secretary of the Treasury began making purchases without approval from the president, and the commission disbanded in 1836.

== Independence ==
It is often described as America's first independent agency. Law professors Christine Chabot and Eliga Gould reference the Sinking Fund Commission as an example of an independent executive agency with a similar structure to the Federal Reserve and its open market committee with some commissioners, namely the Vice President of the United States and Chief Justice of the Supreme Court, not subject to the president's removal power. Other legal scholars have disputed the Sinking Fund's independence, referencing statutory provisions requiring presidential approval of the commission's decisions to purchase securities and the president's ability to remove a majority of its members, namely cabinet secretaries.
