= William Duer (Continental congressman) =

American Founding Father and politician (1743–1799)

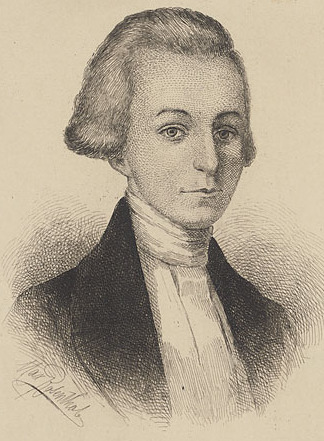
- Etching of William Duer by Max Rosenthal

1st Assistant Secretary of the Treasury
- In office 1789–1792

Member of the Continental Congress
- In office 1778–1779
- Preceded by: Inaugural holder
- Succeeded by: Ebenezer Russell

Member of the New York State Senate for the Eastern District
- In office September 9, 1777 – June 30, 1778

Member of the Provincial Congress
- In office 1775–1775

Personal details
- Born: March 18, 1743 Devon, Great Britain
- Died: May 7, 1799 (aged 56) New York City, U.S.
- Party: Federalist
- Spouse: Catherine Alexander (m. 1779)
- Relations: William Duer (grandson)
- Children: 8, including William, John
- Parent(s): John Duer; Frances Frye
- Education: Eton College

William Duer (March 18, 1743 – May 7, 1799) was a British-born American jurist, developer, and financial speculator from New York City. A Federalist, Duer wrote in support of ratifying the United States Constitution as "Philo-Publius". He had earlier served in the Continental Congress and the convention that framed the New York Constitution. In 1778, Duer signed the United States Articles of Confederation and is one of the Founding Fathers of the United States.

Duer owned 10 slaves.

Duer spent most of his life as a financial speculator. In 1792, following his involvement in one of the nation's first financial panics, Duer went bankrupt and was confined to debtors' prison, where he died seven years later.

== Early life ==
Duer was born in Devonshire, Great Britain, in 1743. He was the son of John Duer, a planter in Antigua in the West Indies, who kept a villa in Devon, and Frances Frye. She was the daughter of Sir Frederick Frye, who held a command in the West Indies, where she met and married Duer.

Duer was educated at Eton College, and while still under age, was put into the army as ensign. He accompanied Robert Clive as aide-de-camp on his return to India as governor general in 1762. He suffered severely from the climate, so Lord Clive sent him back to England, where he remained five years until his father's death, upon which he inherited his father's estates in Dominica.

== Career ==
Coat of Arms of William Duer

Having left the army, Duer went to Antigua. He traveled to New York State for the first time in 1768, to arrange for a regular and constant supply of lumber for his plantations in Antigua and Dominica. As a planter, he traded extensively with Philip Schuyler, who persuaded him to move to New York early in the 1770s. On a previous trip to the area, Duer had purchased tracts of land on the upper Hudson River near Albany. The area, known as Fort Miller, served both as Duer's first residence and as the site of his early financial ventures. Duer set up sawmills, warehouses, and a store.

In 1773 he returned to England, where he obtained a contract to supply the Royal Navy with timber for masts and spars. By 1776, had built a moderately successful mercantile business based primarily on lumber production.

=== American Revolution ===
Duer was originally a moderate Whig, somewhat reluctant to become involved in active resistance to the British government. But he became a member of the Provincial Congress in 1775; he was one of the committee which drafted the original New York Constitution the next year.

Duer was a member of the 1st New York State Legislature, serving in the New York State Senate for the Eastern District from September 9, 1777 to June 30, 1778. (Note: The Eastern District (3 seats) consisted of Charlotte, Cumberland and Gloucester counties.) He served as a member of the Continental Congress in 1778 and 1779. While in Congress, he reportedly impressed future president John Adams and financier Robert Morris from Philadelphia, with whom he served on the finance committees as well as the "Board of War," the precursor to the War Department.

In 1779, Duer returned to private business, in partnership with John Holker, the French commercial agent. He also did well in his business of supplying the American army, under contracts arranged for him by Robert Morris.

=== Later life ===
Duer became a prominent speculator after the war; he was also elected to the New York General Assembly in 1786. When Alexander Hamilton, Schuyler's son-in-law, became first Secretary of the Treasury in 1789, Duer became the first Assistant Secretary. He continued to speculate in American bonds, including the failed Scioto Company scheme to buy up the American debt to France at a discount.

Duer went bankrupt as a result of the Panic of 1792, and was held in debtors' prison for the rest of his life. His failure has been cited as a cause of the panic, reportedly the first in New York caused by speculation. The loss was estimated at 3 million dollars and impoverished many in all classes.

== Personal life ==
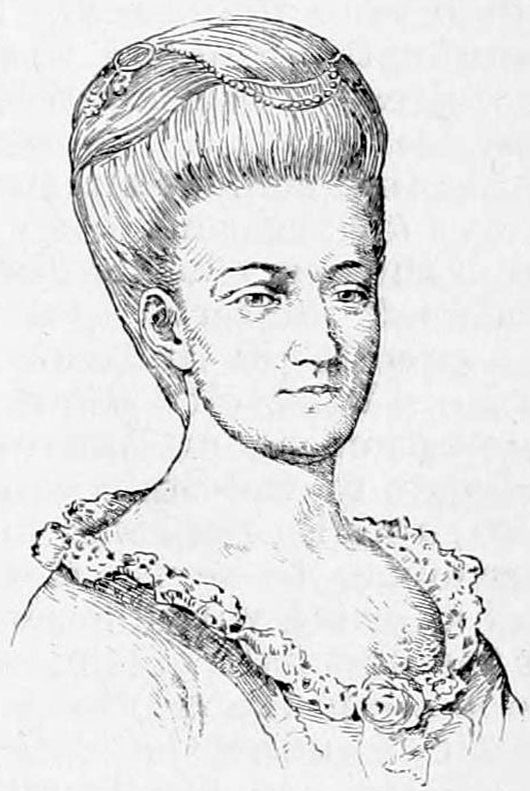
Catherine Duer

In 1779, Duer married Lady Catherine Alexander (1755–1826), second daughter of Sarah (née Livingston) Alexander and Lord Stirling, a major general in the Continental Army. The marriage took place at Stirling's country seat, "The Buildings," near Basking Ridge, New Jersey. It was designed in the style of a residence of an English nobleman, with all the appointments of an English country seat. Catherine's paternal grandparents were New Jersey Attorney General James Alexander and merchant Mary Spratt Provoost Alexander, and her maternal grandparents were Catherine Van Brugh Livingston and Philip Livingston, 2nd Lord of Livingston Manor. She was, descended from the De Peysters, Livingstons, and Schuylers, and occupied a prominent place in the society of the period.

Together, they were the parents of eight children, including:

- William Alexander Duer (1780–1858), who was a justice of the New York State Supreme Court, and for many years the President of Columbia University. He married Hannah Maria Denning (1782–1862), daughter of U.S. Representative William Denning.
- John Duer (1782–1858), who was a noted lawyer and jurist of New York. He married Anna Bedford Bunner (1783–1864), sister of U.S. Representative Rudolph Bunner.
- Frances Duer (1786–1869), who was married to Beverley Robinson (1779–1857), grandson of merchant Beverley Robinson.
- Sarah Henrietta Duer (b. 1787), who married John Witherspoon Smith, son and grandson of Princeton Presidents Samuel Stanhope Smith and John Witherspoon.
- Catherine Alexander Duer (1788–1882).
- Maria Theodora Duer (1789–1837), who married Beverly Chew (1773–1851) in 1810.
- Henrietta Elizabeth Duer (1790–1839), who married Morris Robinson (1784–1849), brother of Beverley Robinson and founder of the Mutual Life Insurance Company of New York.
- Alexander Duer (1793–1819), who married Ann Maria Westcott (1808–1897), daughter of Col. and New York State Senator David M. Westcott, in 1815.

Duer died in New York City on April 18, 1799 at age 57. He was buried in the family vault under the old church of St. Thomas and was later reinterred in Jamaica, Long Island, New York. After his death, his widow remarried to William Neilson on September 15, 1801.

=== Descendants ===
Through his eldest son William, he was the grandfather of Denning Duer, (Note: Denning Duer (1812–1891) was married to Caroline King (1813–1863), eldest daughter of U.S. Representative James Gore King (1791–1853).) great-grandfather of James Gore King Duer, and the great-great-grandfather of Alice Duer Miller (1874–1942), the feminist poet and writer. Through his son John, he was the grandfather of William Duer (1805–1879) who served in the U.S. Congress representing New York.
