= Thomas Hillhouse (American politician) =

American politician (1816–1897)

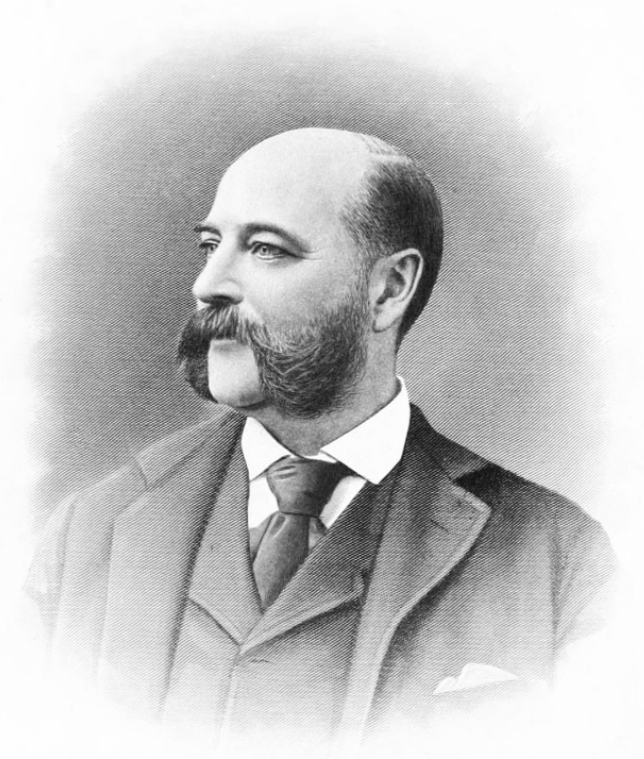

Member of the New York State Senate from the 26th district
- In office 1860–1861
- Preceded by: Truman Boardman
- Succeeded by: Charles J. Folger

Adjutant General of New York
- In office July 1861 – 1862
- Governor: Edwin D. Morgan
- Preceded by: John Meredith Read, Jr.
- Succeeded by: Franklin Townsend

New York State Comptroller
- In office 1866–1867
- Governor: Reuben Fenton
- Preceded by: Lucius Robinson
- Succeeded by: William F. Allen

Personal details
- Born: March 10, 1816 Watervliet, New York, U.S.
- Died: July 31, 1897 (aged 81) Yonkers, New York, U.S.
- Party: Republican
- Spouse: Harriet Prouty (m. 1844)
- Relations: James Hillhouse (uncle)
- Children: 6
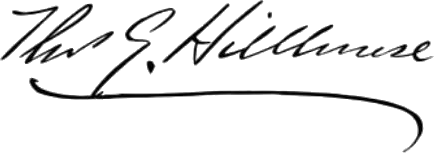
- Signature

Thomas Hillhouse (March 10, 1816 – July 31, 1897) was an American farmer, banker and politician.

== Early life ==
He was born on March 10, 1816, at Walnut Grove in Watervliet in Albany County, New York. He was the son of Thomas Hillhouse (1766–1835) and Anna Van Schaick Ten Broeck (1787–1865), who married in 1812 in Hudson, New York. His father's first wife, Harriet Hosmer (a daughter of Titus Hosmer), died in 1811. Among his siblings were Sarah Ann Hillhouse (wife of Amos Stone Perry), John Hillhouse (who married Catherine Van Vranken), William Hillhouse (who married Frances Julia Betts), and half-sister, Harriet Hillhouse, who married Cornelius Schuyler.

His father was the youngest son and ninth child of William Hillhouse and Sarah (née Griswold) Hillhouse (the sister of Gov. Matthew Griswold). His uncle was James Hillhouse, the Federalist Senator from Connecticut. His maternal grandparents were Brevet Maj. John Cornelius Ten Broeck and Anna (née Ten Broeck) Ten Broeck.

Following his father's death when he was eighteen years old, he returned home to live and work on his father's farm until 1851, when he moved to Geneva, New York, in Ontario County to live in a house built his father-in-law on the banks of Seneca Lake.

== Career ==
After ten years as a country gentleman farmer, and at the urging of his father-in-law, Hillhouse became involved in politics and the anti-slavery movement. He was elected as a member of the New York State Senate (26th D.) in 1860 and 1861. In the Senate, he served as chairman of the Committee on National Affairs. Due to his work as chairman, he was appointed Adjutant General of New York by Governor Edwin D. Morgan, from July 1861 until the end of 1862. During the American Civil War the state militia fought with the Union Army. Hillhouse was succeeded as adjutant general by John T. Sprague.

After the war ended, he returned to Geneva to resume the life of a private citizen, however, he was quickly elected in 1865 on the Republican ticket as New York State Comptroller, serving from 1866 to 1867, but defeated for re-election in 1867. In 1870, President Ulysses S. Grant appointed Hillhouse Assistant Treasurer of the United States, in the City of New York. During these years, he also "he filled this office the resumption of Specie payments took place, adding greatly to its cares."

He was in office for eleven years and three terms until he resigned in 1881 to become first President of the Metropolitan Trust Company in New York City, a position he held until his death in 1897. In 1882, he was elected a trustee of The Bank for Savings in the City of New-York, the first savings bank in New York City.

== Personal life ==
On December 11, 1844, Hillhouse was married to Harriet Prouty (1823–1903), the eldest child of wealthy merchant Phineas Prouty and his wife, Margaret Matilda (née Van Vranken) Prouty. Her younger brother was Phineas Prouty. Her second cousin, Catherine Mynderse Van Vranken married Thomas' brother, John Hillhouse. Together, they were the parents of:

- Margaret Prouty Hillhouse (b. 1846), a poet and writer.
- Thomas Griswold Hillhouse (1848–1910), who married Julia Ten Eyck (1847–1941), a daughter of U.S. Senator John Conover Ten Eyck.
- Phineas Prouty Hillhouse (1850–1878), who married Caroline Matilda Van Rensselaer (1848–1941), a daughter of Maunsell van Rensselaer (brother of Charles W. van Rensselaer, both grandson of U.S. Representative Killian K. Van Rensselaer).
- Harriet Augusta Hillhouse (1853–1933), who married Walter Wood Adams.
- Anna Hillhouse (1858–1860), who died young.
- Adelaide Hillhouse (1865–1925), who died unmarried.

He died on July 31, 1897, at his son's residence in Yonkers, Westchester County, New York. His widow died on March 16, 1903, at Springside in Yonkers.

New York State Senate
Preceded by Truman Boardman	New York State Senate; 26th District; 1860–1861	Succeeded by Charles J. Folger
Political offices
Preceded by Lucius Robinson	New York State Comptroller; 1866–1867	Succeeded by William F. Allen
