= John Duer =

American jurist (1782–1858)

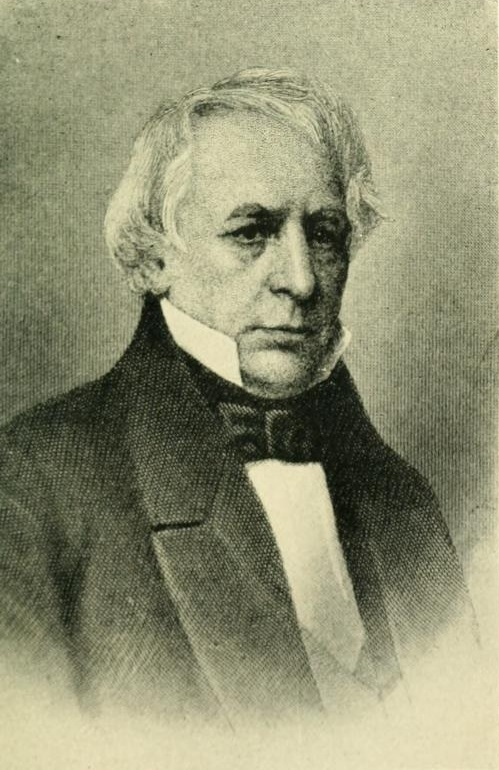

3rd United States Attorney for the Southern District of New York
- In office February 9, 1828 – April 30, 1829
- President: John Quincy Adams
- Preceded by: Robert L. Tillotson
- Succeeded by: James A. Hamilton

Personal details
- Born: October 7, 1782 Albany, New York, US
- Died: August 8, 1858 (aged 75) Staten Island, New York, US
- Resting place: Trinity Churchyard Cemetery, Manhattan, New York
- Occupation: Attorney; Judge; Philanthropist

John Duer (October 7, 1782 – August 8, 1858) was a New York attorney, jurist, and co-founder of Children's Village.

== Biography ==
Born in Albany, New York on October 7, 1782, he was the son of William and Catherine Duer. William Alexander Duer was his brother, and his maternal grandfather was William Alexander, Lord Stirling. He was the father of William Duer (1805–1879), who also served in Congress.

John Duer entered the army at age 16, but after two years left to read law in the office of Alexander Hamilton. He was admitted to the bar, began a practice in Orange County, New York, and moved to New York City in 1820, where he became a highly successful insurance lawyer.

He was a delegate to the State constitutional convention in 1821. In 1825 he was appointed with Benjamin F. Butler and John Canfield Spencer to the commission that revised the state statutes, and he was especially active in preparing the first half of the work. From 1828 to 1829 he was United States Attorney for the Southern District of New York.

He was elected an associate judge of the New York Superior Court in 1849, and on the death of Judge Thomas J. Oakley in 1857, Duer became chief justice.

Duer died on Staten Island on August 8, 1858, and was buried at Trinity Churchyard Cemetery in Manhattan.

== Works ==
At the time of his death, he was editing Duer's Reports of the Decisions of the Superior Court, the sixth volume of which he left incomplete.

His other published works include:

- A Lecture on the Law of Representations in Marine Insurance, with Notes and Illustrations (New York, 1844)
- A Treatise on the Law and Practice of Marine Insurance, which became a standard authority in the United States (2 vols., 1845–46)
- A Discourse on the Life, Character, and Public Services of James Kent, Chancellor of the State of New York, delivered by request before the judiciary and bar of the city and county of New York (12 April 1848).
- Three of the Revised Statutes of the State, in connection with Benjamin F. Butler and John C. Spencer. Report of the Commissioners Appointed to Revise the Statute Laws of this State (New York, 1826).

== Notes ==
Legal offices
| Preceded by Robert L. Tillotson | U.S. Attorney for the Southern District of New York; 1828–1829 | Succeeded by James A. Hamilton |
