= William Duer (U.S. congressman) =

American politician

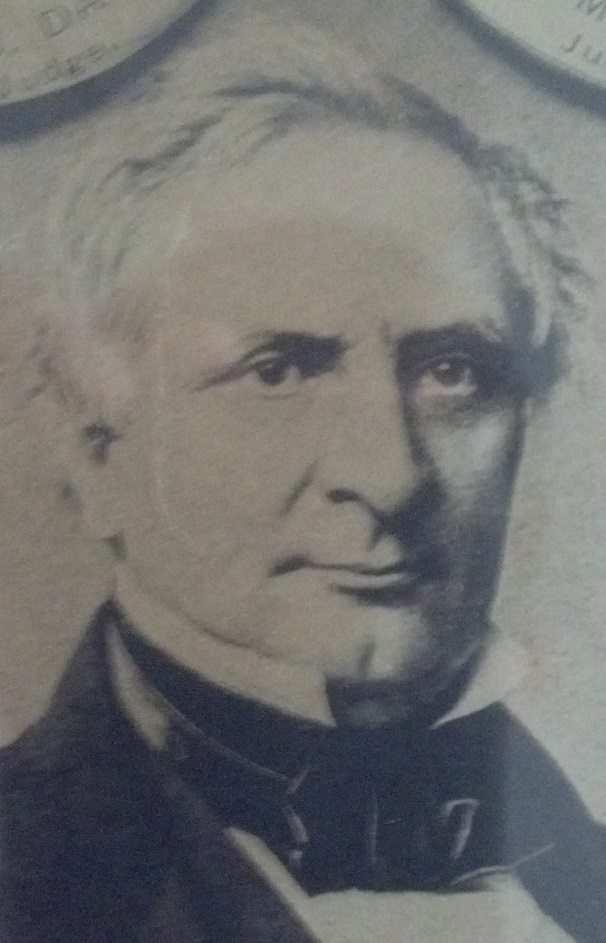

Member of the U.S. House of Representatives from New York's 23rd district
- In office March 4, 1847 – March 3, 1851
- Preceded by: William J. Hough
- Succeeded by: Leander Babcock

County Clerk of San Francisco, California
- In office October 1857 – October 1859
- Preceded by: Thomas Hayes
- Succeeded by: Washington Bartlett

United States Consul to Valparaíso, Chile
- In office 1851–1853
- Preceded by: Zabdiel W. Potter
- Succeeded by: Reuben Wood

District Attorney of Oswego County, New York
- In office 1845–1847
- Preceded by: Leander Babcock
- Succeeded by: Ransom H. Tyler

Member of the New York State Assembly from Oswego County
- In office January 1, 1840 – January 31, 1841 Serving with Peter Devendorf (1st term); Edward B. Judson (2nd term)
- Preceded by: Samuel Hawley, Edward B. Judson
- Succeeded by: Peter Devendorf, Robert Kenyon

Personal details
- Born: March 25, 1805 New York City, New York
- Died: August 25, 1879 (aged 74) New Brighton, Staten Island, New York
- Resting place: Silver Mount Cemetery, Staten Island, New York
- Party: Whig (before 1860); Constitutional Union (1860); Democratic (after 1860)
- Education: Columbia College
- Profession: Attorney

William Duer (March 25, 1805 – August 25, 1879) was an American lawyer and politician. In addition to serving in local offices in both California and New York, he represented New York in the United States House of Representatives from 1847 to 1851.

A native of New York City, Duer was a member of a family long prominent in New York politics and government. He graduated from Columbia College in 1824, studied law in New York City, and attained admission to the bar in 1828. After practicing in Oswego for two years, he returned to New York City, where he continued practicing law. After a brief residence in New Orleans, in 1835 he returned to Oswego, where he became active in politics and government as a Whig. He served in the New York State Assembly for two one-year terms (1840 and 1841) and was Oswego County's District Attorney from 1845 to 1847. In 1846, Duer was elected to the U.S. House. He was reelected in 1848 and served two terms, 1847 to 1851.

After leaving Congress, Duer served as U.S. Consul in Valparaíso, Chile for two years, then moved to San Francisco, where he practiced law and served as county clerk. In 1859 he returned to Oswego, where he was active in efforts to prevent the onset of the American Civil War. Once the conflict began, Duer supported the Union, but opposed the Republican Party and continued to advocate for concessions on the slavery and secession issues a way to end the war.

In retirement, Duer resided on Staten Island. He died there in 1879 and was buried at Silver Mount Cemetery.

== Early life ==
William Duer was born in New York City on March 25, 1805, the son of John Duer (1782–1858) and Anna Bedford Bunner Duer (1783–1864). William Duer was the grandson of Continental Congressman William Duer (1747–1799) and great-grandson of General William Alexander. Rudolph Bunner was his uncle.

He graduated from Columbia College in 1824 and was the valedictorian of his class. He studied law, was admitted to the bar, and began to practice in Oswego.

== Start of career ==
In 1830, Duer moved to New York City. Later that year, Duer and Elijah Paine Jr. published a reference work in octavo format, Practice of the Courts of Common Law in the State of New York. In 1832, he ran unsuccessfully for the New York State Assembly. He lived in New Orleans from 1833 to 1835, then returned to Oswego, where he continued to practice law. Duer served in the Assembly in 1840 and 1841. In 1842 he was an unsuccessful candidate for Congress.

Duer was a Delegate to the 1844 Whig National Convention. He served as Oswego County District Attorney from 1845 to 1847.

== Congressman ==
In 1846 Duer was elected to the United States House of Representatives as a Whig. He was reelected in 1848 and served in the 30th and 31st Congresses, March 4, 1847 to March 3, 1851.

In Congress, Duer pursued a moderate course on slavery and was willing to allow it to continue where it already existed, but not to expand to new territories unless approved by the voters. He supported both the Wilmot Proviso and the Compromise of 1850.

During the protracted struggle to elect a Speaker of the House in 1849, Duer's name was one of those brought forth as a compromise choice. During a discussion about the Speakership election, Duer stated that Richard Kidder Meade, a Virginia Democrat, was a dis-unionist who favored secession. Meade denied it, which prompted Duer to accuse him of lying. A near-riot ensued, with Democrats attacking Whig and Free Soil Party legislators, and the Sergeant at Arms unable to immediately restore order. Meade and Duer were separated by other House members, and the issue was resolved without further violence when Meade stated that he had not meant to impugn Duer's integrity in his reply to Duer's claim that Meade was a secessionist, and Duer withdrew the word "liar" to describe Meade's reply.

== Later career ==
After leaving Congress Duer was appointed Consul in Valparaíso, Chile, and he served from 1851 to 1853.

In 1854, Duer began to reside in San Francisco, California and founded a law firm in partnership with Balie Peyton, Delos Lake, and Julius K. Rose. He served as San Francisco's County Clerk from October 1857 to October 1859.

In 1859, Duer returned to Oswego. During the 1860 presidential election, Duer was opposed to secession and civil war, so he attempted to rally support for a moderate course that made concessions on slavery in order to prevent the slave holding states from leaving the Union. To that end, he supported the Constitutional Union Party ticket of John Bell for president and Edward Everett for vice president. Later that year, Duer sent a widely reprinted letter to several newspapers in which he urged Bell and Everett supporters to switch their allegiance to Democrat Stephen A. Douglas as the best chance of preserving the Union. In addition, he was nominated for Congress by a convention that attempted to create a fusion of Bell, Douglas, and John C. Breckinridge supporters, but attracted little support in the 22nd District. In the general election, Republican William E. Lansing soundly defeated Douglas Democrat D. Franklin Chapman.

During the American Civil War, Duer remained a unionist, but affiliated with the Democratic Party; in 1861, he was elected as a delegate to the state Democratic convention. Duer continued to advocate concessions to the southern states in order to end the war. Among his proposals was one calling for the slave holding states to return to the Union so they could advocate for secession by means of a Constitutional amendment; in his view, if the southern states were determined to leave the Union, they were required to follow a legal process for doing so rather than engaging in armed rebellion.

== Retirement and death ==
In retirement, Duer was a resident of Staten Island. He died in New Brighton on August 25, 1879. Duer was buried at Silver Mount Cemetery.

== Family ==
In 1835, Duer married Lucy Chew (1816-1900), a distant cousin who was the daughter of Beverley Chew and Marie Theodosia (Duer) Chew of New Orleans. They were the parents of John, Beverley, Marie, Anne, Catharine, and Irving.

== Sources ==
=== Books ===
- San Francisco Municipal Reports. San Francisco, CA: Towne & Bacon. 1860.
- Publications of the Oswego Historical Society. Vol. 11. Oswego, NY: Oswego Historical Society. 1950.
- Blake, Evarts I. (1902). San Francisco and its Municipal Administration. San Francisco, CA: Pacific Publishing Company.
- Freeman, Joanne B. (11 September 2018). The Field of Blood: Violence in Congress and the Road to Civil War. New York, NY: Farrar, Straus and Giroux. ISBN 978-0-3747-1761-2.
- Shuck, Oscar Tully (1901). History of the Bench and Bar of California. Los Angeles, CA: Commercial printing House. ISBN 9781584777069.
- Van Pelt, Daniel (1898). Leslie's History of the Greater New York. New York, NY: Arkell Publishing.
- Van Rensselaer, Florence (1949). The Livingston Family in America and its Scottish Origins. New York, NY: F. Van Rensselaer.
- Wheeler, Henry G. (1848). History of Congress, Biographical and Political. Vol. 1. New York, NY: Harper & Brothers.

=== Newspapers ===
- "What Does it Mean?". Nashville Union-American. Nashville, TN. July 20, 1860 – via Newspapers.com.
- "Hon. Wm. Duer". Belmont Chronicle. St. Clairsville, OH. August 9, 1860 – via Newspapers.com.
- "Getting Their Reward". Chicago Tribune. Chicago, IL. October 2, 1860 – via Newspapers.com.
- "Congressional Nominations". The New York Times. New York, NY. November 5, 1860 – via Newspapers.com.
- "Congressmen Elected". Poughkeepsie Journal. Poughkeepsie, NY. November 10, 1860 – via Newspapers.com.
- "Letter from Hon. William Duer". New York Herald. New York, NY. January 19, 1861 – via Newspapers.com.
- "Hon. Wm. Duer". Buffalo Morning Express. Buffalo, NY. January 28, 1861 – via Newspapers.com.
- "Obituary, William Duer". The New York Times. New York, NY. August 27, 1879 – via Newspapers.com.

U.S. House of Representatives
Preceded by William Jervis Hough	Member of the U.S. House of Representatives from New York's 23rd congressional district March 4, 1847 – March 3, 1851	Succeeded by Leander Babcock
