= Oasis Commission =

Oasis was a series of diocesan ministries of the Episcopal Church to LGBT (lesbian, gay, bisexual and transgender) persons.

The first Oasis group was established in the Episcopal Diocese of Newark by bishop John Shelby Spong on June 21, 1989, at All Saints Church, Hoboken. Its first leader, The Rev. Robert Williams had been the first out gay man to be ordained to the priesthood. However, Williams and Spong clashed on theological and moral issues and he left the organization shortly thereafter, replaced by The Rev. David Norgard. At this time, making gay and lesbian people feel welcome in churches was the exception, rather than the rule. The Oasis provided a "safe space" for them to worship together, as well as social events, educational opportunities, etc., while also helping build acceptance in the rest of the church. By its seventh anniversary celebration, which was led by the Presiding Bishop of the Episcopal Church, The Most Rev. Edmond Browning, nearly half of the diocese's congregations were supporting the work of The Oasis. In January of that year, a diocesan LGBT ministry in San Francisco which had operated as The Parsonage since 1981 was reorganized with the assistance of Norgard as Oasis/California. Similar ministries have also been founded in Michigan, Missouri, the Diocese of New Jersey, and the Diocese of Rochester in upstate New York.

Since the formation of The Oasis, time the climate within the Episcopal Church has become much more welcoming. The Oasis ministries work alongside IntegrityUSA, a national organization which was founded by Louie Crew in 1974, in projects like Believe Out Loud, an ecumenical campaign to promote LGBT inclusion within mainline Protestant denominations.

== See also ==
- LGBT-welcoming church programs
