= Church Club of New York =

Episcopal club in the United States

The Church Club of New York is an Episcopal private member's club in New York City with 285 members (2020 Annual Report). It has EIN 13-1623944 as a 501(c)(3) Public Charity and claimed total revenue of $100,402 and total assets of $386,218 in its Form 990 financials for 2010.

== Location ==
The club is located in Manhattan. The club first met at 146 Fifth Avenue. Other locations included the Bible House, the Chatham Hotel, the Ambassador Hotel on Park Avenue and the Plaza Hotel.

== History ==
The Church Club of New York was established in 1887. It was incorporated six years later, in 1893. Founding members included banking magnate J.P. Morgan as well as Nicholas Murray Butler, Stuyvesant Fish, E.H. Harriman, Eugenius Harvey Outerbridge as well as the Rockefellers, Roosevelts, Satterlees, and the Van Rensselaers. Later, John V. Lindsay, Horace Havemeyer (1886–1956), and George B. Post joined as well. George Zabriskie served as the club president from 1892 to 1894. The club held annual white-tie dinners at the Waldorf Astoria New York as well as an annual symposium by British and American scholars of the Episcopal faith.

In the 1940s, Clifford Phelps Morehouse, the editor of The Living Church, was a member of the club. Moreover, in 1942, Viscount Halifax, who served as the British ambassador to the United States, spoke to the club. Another speaker was Professor Powel Mills Dawley, who organized roundtables. By 1946, the club paved the way for a more accepting attitude towards remarriages after a divorce for their members.

At the annual dinner in 1953, Bishop Horace Donegan called for an end to the rackets near the docks in New York City and criminal activities in Morningside Heights. The lecture was welcomed by the New York press. A year later, in 1954, ethnic minorities, as long as they were male, were admitted as members.

A decade later, in 1962, Lord Fisher of Lambeth was the guest of honor at the annual time at The Pierre. Four years later, in 1966, the Bishop of London, Robert Stopford, was guest of honor at the annual dinner, which took place at the University Club of New York. In 1967, Michael Ramsey, the Archbishop of Canterbury, also gave a talk at the annual dinner.

In 1975, the club started admitting women as members. The first female president was Grace Allen. In 2000, Archbishop George Carey spoke at the annual dinner. Four years later, in 2004, Robin Eames, Archbishop of Armagh, was the speaker. In 2022, the annual dinner speaker was Sarah Mullally, the Bishop of London. In 2023, the annual dinner speaker was Rose Hudson-Wilkin, Bishop of Dover and Bishop in Canterbury.

The current board president is Nicholas Birns. The club maintains a library of 1,500 volumes.
