= P day =

P day, P-Day, or P. Day may refer to:

- P-Day, a US military designation of time
- Pea Ridge Day (1899–1934), American baseball player
- Peter Day (disambiguation), various people
