= Louie Crew =

American writer (1936–2019)

Louie Clay
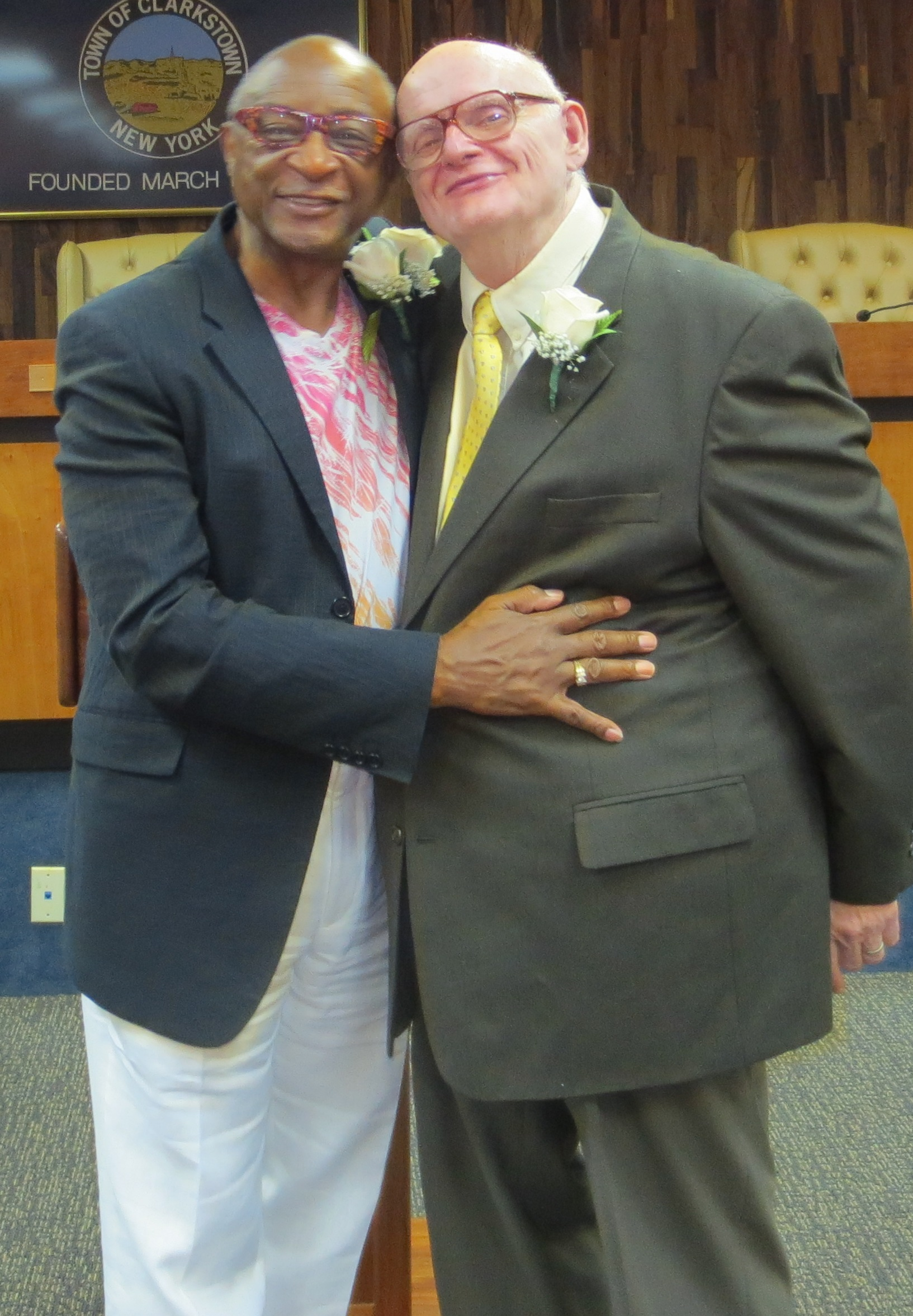
- Ernest (l) & Louie (r) at civil marriage, 8/22/13
- Born: Erman Louie Crew Jr. December 9, 1936; Anniston, Alabama, United States
- Died: November 27, 2019 (aged 82); Newark, New Jersey, United States
- Occupations: Professor emeritus; activist
- Organizations: Integrity USA; LGBT caucus of the National Council of Teachers of English
- Spouses: Flora Mae Friedrich (m. 1968; div. 1973) Ernest Clay (m. 1974) (not legally binding) Ernest Clay (m. 2013) (legally binding)

Academic background
- Education: Baylor University; Auburn University; University of Alabama
- Thesis: Dickens' use of language for protest (1971)
- Writing career
- Years active: 1959-2019

Erman Louie Clay (né Erman Louie Crew Jr.) (1936–2019) was an American professor emeritus of English at Rutgers University. He was best known for his long and increasingly successful campaign for the acceptance of gay and lesbian people by Christians in general, and the Episcopal Church in particular.

== Early life and education ==
Erman Louie Crew Jr. was born on December 9, 1936, in Anniston, Alabama. Crew was educated at The McCallie School, and graduated in 1954.

Continuing his education, Crew received a B.A. from Baylor University in (1958), a M.A. from Auburn University in 1959 and, a Ph.D. from the University of Alabama in 1971.

== Career ==
Crew taught at Auburn University, Darlington School, St. Andrew's School (Delaware), Penge Secondary Modern School, London, University of Alabama, Experiment in International Living, Claflin University, Fort Valley State University, University of Wisconsin–Stevens Point, Beijing International Studies University, Chinese University of Hong Kong and Rutgers University.

=== Activism ===
While teaching at Fort Valley State University, Crew founded Integrity USA, a gay-acceptance group within the Episcopal Church (1974). With Julia Penelope, Crew co-founded the LGBT caucus of the National Council of Teachers of English (1975). He served on the board of directors of the National Gay and Lesbian Task Force from 1976 to 1978. After he moved to Wisconsin, he served on the Wisconsin Governor's Council on Lesbian and Gay Issues in 1983.

When Crew first began working for the inclusion of LGBT people in the Episcopal church, he was widely denounced and dismissed, but today the Episcopal Church has come to agree with many of his views, while some churches and dioceses are strongly opposed.

Crew sat on the Episcopal Church's executive council (2000–2006). He was elected by the Episcopal Diocese of Newark to serve as a deputy to six triennial national General Conventions (1994, 1997, 2000, 2003, 2006, 2009). He was a devoted Anglo-Catholic and for many years a member of Grace Church in Newark.

Crew maintained a comprehensive Web site with information about the Episcopal Church and the Anglican Communion. Professor Ed Rodman at the Episcopal Divinity School says that Crew's first and foremost contribution was that "he brought internet literacy to the church".

=== Queer Poet and Writer ===
Editors have published more than 2,638 of Crew's manuscripts, including his most recent book Letters from Samaria: The Prose & Poetry of Louie Crew Clay edited by Max Niedzwiecki (Morehouse, New York, 2015) plus four poetry volumes: Sunspots (Lotus Press, Detroit, 1976) Midnight Lessons (Samisdat, 1987), Lutibelle's Pew (Dragon Disks, 1990), and Queers! for Christ's Sake! (Dragon Disks, 2003) Crew sometimes uses the noms de plume Li Min Hua, Quean Lutibelle, and Dr. Ddungo. YouTube has numerous videos of Crew reading his own poems.

Crew wrote the first openly LGBT materials ever published by Christianity & Crisis, Change Magazine Chronicle of Higher Education, FOR (Fellowship of Reconciliation), The Living Church and Southern Exposure. With Rictor Norton, Crew co-edited a special issue of College English on "The Homosexual Imagination" (November 1974). He served on the editorial board of the Journal of Homosexuality (1978–83; 1989–2012). He edited the 1978 book The Gay Academic, the book Telling Our Stories and the book 101 Reasons to Be Episcopalian.

Crew's papers are deposited in The Labadie Collection at the University of Michigan.

== Recognition ==
- Crew received honorary Doctor of Divinity degrees from Episcopal Divinity School in 1999 and from General Theological Seminary in 2003, and an honorary Doctor of Humane Letters degree from the Church Divinity School of the Pacific in 2004.
- He had been a Fellow for the National Endowment for the Humanities three times: University of California, Berkeley 1974, University of Texas at Austin 1977, and University of Chicago, 1981.
- He was a poet in residence at Helene Wurlitzer Foundation of New Mexico (1963) and at Ragdale (1988)
- Episcopal Divinity School established scholarship under his name.
- He was the recipient of the Bishop's Cross from the Rt. Rev. John Shelby Spong, Diocese of Newark, in 2000.

== Personal life ==
Louie Crew married Flora Mae Friedrich on May 25, 1968. She was his freshman English student in the spring of 1967. The marriage ended 5 years later in divorce.

Louie Crew married Ernest Clay on February 2, 1974, although at the time their marriage had no legal standing. They married legally on August 22, 2013, and Crew took on his husband's last name. The two are featured together in "Not That Kind of Christian", an 80-minute documentary film by Andrew Grossman, which premiered at the Breckenridge Film Festival in 2007.

== Publications ==
- Crew, Louie (1976). Sunspots: poems (1 ed.). Detroit, Michigan: Lotus Press. ISBN 9780916418069. OCLC 2596976.
- Crew, Louie, ed. (1978). The Gay Academic (1 ed.). Palm Springs, California: ETC Publications. ISBN 9780882800363. OCLC 1863538.
- Crew, Louie, ed. (1991). A Book of Revelations: Lesbian and Gay Episcopalians Tell Their Own Stories (1 ed.). Washington, D.C.: Integrity, Inc. ISBN 978-0962950605. OCLC 24001581.
- Crew Clay, Louie (2003). 101 reasons to be Episcopalian. Harrisburg, Pennsylvania: Morehouse Publishing. ISBN 9780819219251.
- Crew Clay, Louie (2015). Niedzwiecki, Max (ed.). Letters from Samaria: The Prose & Poetry of Louie Crew Clay 1974‐2014. New York City: Morehouse Publishing. ISBN 978-0-8192-3219-9.
