= Frederic Cook Morehouse =

American journalist (1868–1932)

Frederic Cook Morehouse (March 19, 1868 – June 25, 1932) was a prominent lay Episcopalian journalist and publisher.

In 1900, Morehouse succeeded Charles Wesley Leffingwell as editor of The Living Church magazine following the purchase of that periodical by the Young Churchman Company. He participated in ecclesiastical debates throughout the beginning of the twentieth century, articulating an Anglo-Catholic position regarding reservation of the Blessed Sacrament and the Thirty-nine Articles. He was a member of the National Council of the Episcopal Church, and also served as a member of the House of Deputies of General Convention for 21 years.

Morehouse's son, Clifford Phelps Morehouse, succeeded him as editor of The Living Church.

== Published works ==
- Some American Churchmen (1892)
- The Evolution of Parties within the Church
- A Churchman's View of the Church's Function

== See also ==
- Linden H. Morehouse
