= Ernest de Koven Leffingwell =

American arctic explorer and geologist

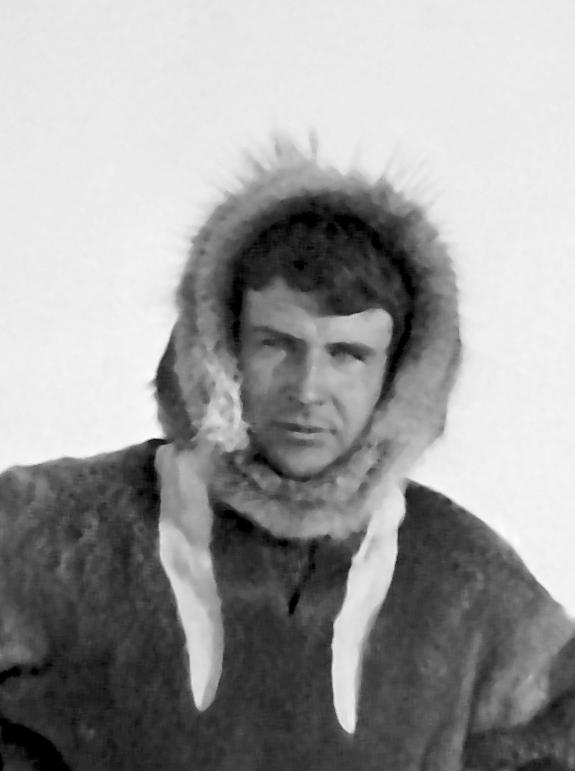
- Born: January 13, 1875; Knoxville, Illinois
- Died: January 27, 1971 (aged 96); Carmel, California
- Education: University of Chicago; Trinity College, Hartford
- Known for: mapping and geology of Alaska North Slope
- Awards: Charles P. Daly Medal (1922)
- Scientific career
- Fields: Geology
- Workplaces: Independent; US Geological Survey

Ernest de Koven Leffingwell (January 13, 1875 – January 27, 1971) was an arctic explorer, geologist and Spanish–American War veteran.

During the period from 1906 to 1914, Leffingwell spent nine summers and six winters on the Arctic coast of Alaska, making 31 trips by dog sled or small boats. He created the first accurate map of a large part of the Alaskan arctic coastline. He was the first to scientifically describe permafrost and to pose theories about permafrost which have largely proven true. He accurately identified the oil potential of the North Slope region of Alaska.

== Biography ==
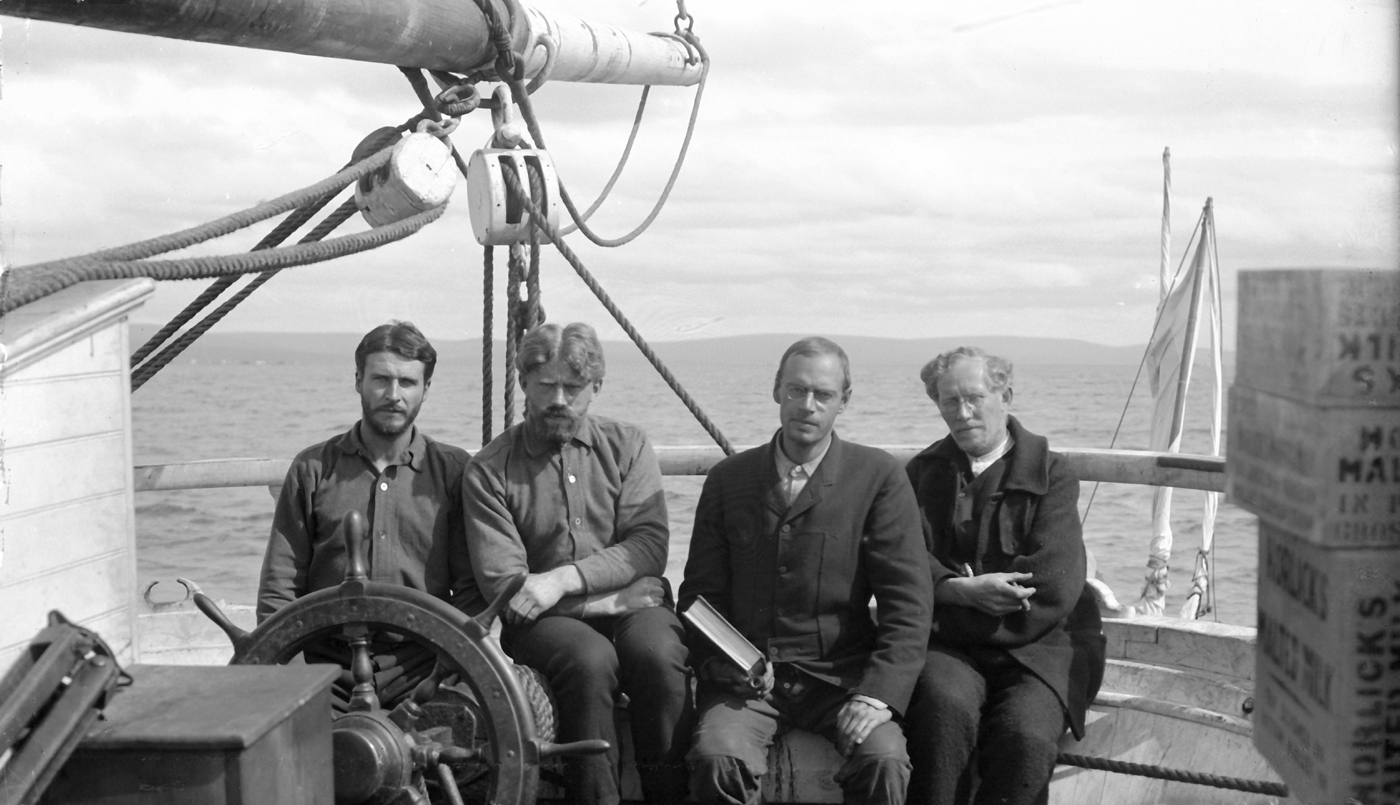
Staff of the Anglo-American Polar Expedition (1906): Ernest de Koven Leffingwell (left), Captain Ejnar Mikkelsen, G. P. Howe, Ejnar Ditlevsen

Ernest de Koven Leffingwell was born January 13, 1875, in Knoxville, Illinois, to Charles and Elizabeth (née Francis) Leffingwell. He attended the grammar school at Racine College, then attended Trinity College, Hartford, Connecticut, where he was captain of the track team his senior year, graduated with the AB degree in 1895 and was awarded a MA in 1900. He studied physics and geology at the University of Chicago 1896 to 1898 and 1900 to 1906. He played on the Chicago Maroons football team. Leffingwell had passed his preliminary examination and was a doctoral candidate when he left for Alaska in 1906 but apparently did not complete the degree. (Note: University of Chicago Bulletin did not list the degree. There is no thesis or dissertation in the University of Chicago library, nor did Leffingwell list the degree in 1917. Herringshaw's (1914) and the identical entry in Men of Mark (1916) appear to have listed the degree in error. Leffingwell's father also has an entry in Herringshaw's.) He taught science at St Alban's school in Knoxville, Illinois, in 1895–96 and 1903–04, in the latter period also serving as Superintendent. During the Spanish–American War he served as a Seaman on the US battleship Oregon during its celebrated dash around Cape Horn and in the Battle of Santiago.

He led the science staff in the 1901 Baldwin-Ziegler North Pole Expedition, which failed in its attempt to reach the North Pole from Franz Josef Land. On this expedition, he became friends with Danish explorer Ejnar Mikkelsen. Subsequently, the two raised funds for their own expedition. Leffingwell's father, who had become wealthy from his ownership of a fruit ranch in California, contributed $5000, and Mikkelsen raised a comparable amount in England and New York. Their venture became the Anglo-American Polar Expedition of 1906–1908 which aimed to explore the Beaufort Sea. At that time, many experts believed than an undiscovered land mass lay in this region, since such a mass could account for observed patterns of arctic currents and tides. The underfunded expedition fared badly but achieved some positive results. No new land was discovered, but they delineated part of the continental shelf and Leffingwell began his mapping efforts. Their ship, the Duchess of Bedford, was locked in pack ice and destroyed, but they salvaged the wood to build a cabin which Leffingwell used intermittently through 1914. Mikkelsen returned to the US in 1907, but Leffingwell remained on the arctic coast for another year. He returned to the North Slope 1909–1912 and 1913–1914, working with one assistant to map 250 km of the arctic coast, and the Canning River valley .

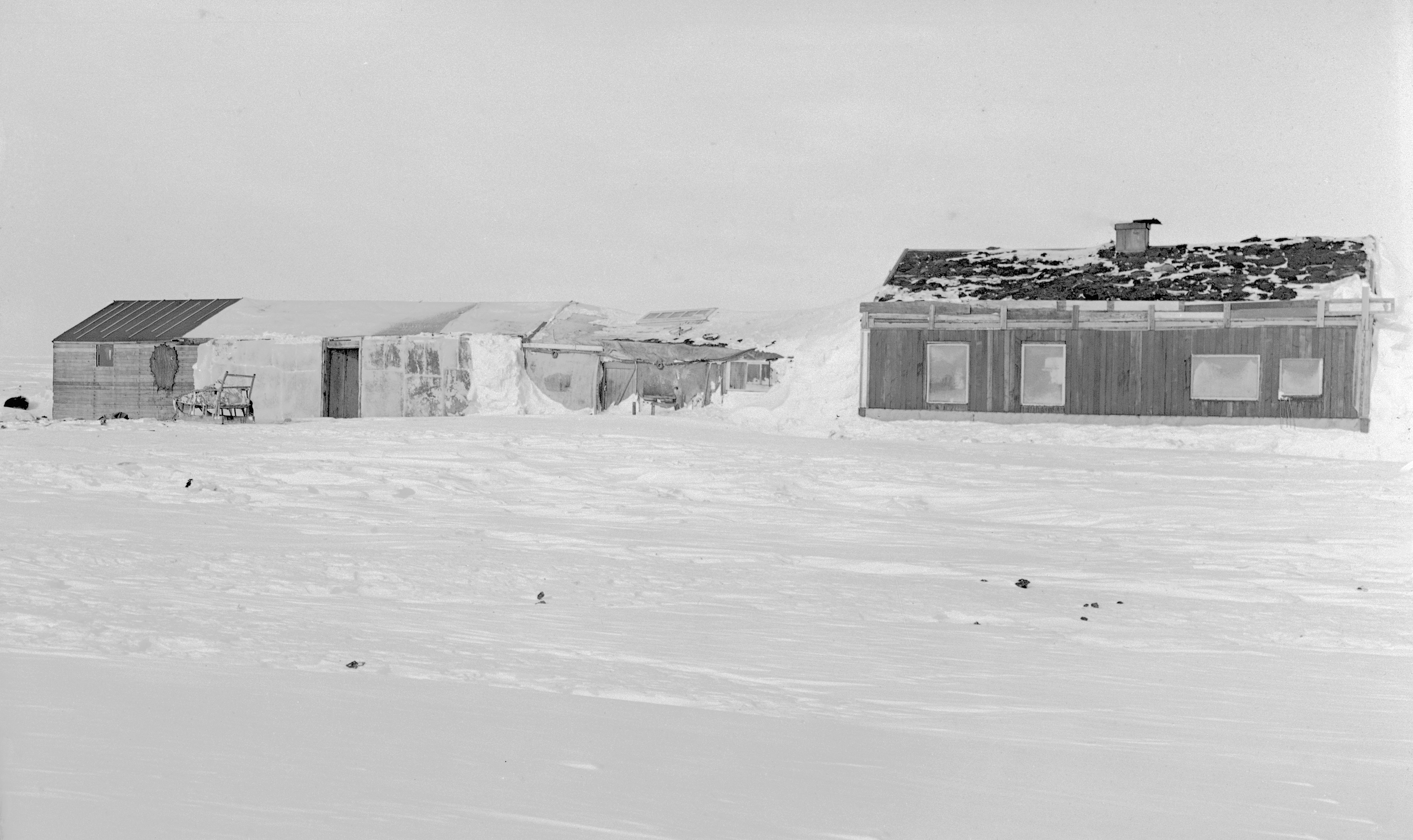
Leffingwell's base on Flaxman Island, circa 1910

After spending a year and a half writing up his results at the United States Geological Survey in Washington, Leffingwell retired to Whittier, California, listing his occupation in 1917 as citriculturist. He moved to Carmel, California, about 20 years later. When he died in 1971, fourteen days after his 96th birthday, he was believed to have been the oldest surviving polar explorer.

== Leffingwell camp site ==
The Leffingwell Camp Site located on a remote barrier island off Alaska, was declared a National Historic Landmark in 1978.

== Honors ==
Leffingwell was awarded the Patron's Medal by the Royal Geographical Society and the Charles P. Daly Medal by the American Geographical Society, both in 1922. He was awarded an honorary Doctor of Science degree by Trinity College in 1923. Leffingwell Fork, a stream on Alaska's North Slope, Leffingwell Ridge (Brooks Range) in the Arctic National Wildlife Refuge, Leffingwell Glacier in the Romanzof Mountains of the Brooks Range, Leffingwell Crags in Canada's Northwest Territories, and Leffingwell Nunatak in Greenland are named for him.

== Publications ==
- SR Capps and EDK Leffingwell (1904) "Pleistocene Geology of the Sawatch Range near Leadville Colo" The Journal of Geology 12, Nov–Dec pp 698–706.
- Ernest de Koven Leffingwell (1908) "Flaxman Island a glacial remnant" Journal of Geology 16 (1) pp. 56–63
- Ernest de Koven Leffingwell (1915a) "A communication from Leffingwell" University of Chicago Magazine 7 (3) January 1915, pp 76–79. Leffingwell's short popular account, written for the alumni magazine. See also page 69.
- Ernest de K. Leffingwell (1915b) "Ground-ice wedges, the dominant form of ground-ice on the north coast of Alaska" Journal of Geology 23, pp 635–654.
- Ernest de K. Leffingwell (1919) The Canning River Region, Northern Alaska Professional paper 109, United States Geological Survey, Govt. print. off., Washington (also at HathiTrust )
- Ernest de Koven Leffingwell (1961) "My Polar Explorations, 1901–1914", Explorers Journal 39, 2–14
