= Robert Williams (American priest) =

American priest

The Reverend Robert Williams
- Church: Episcopal Church

Orders
- Ordination: 16 December 1989 by John Shelby Spong

Personal details
- Born: July 21, 1955 Abilene, Texas, United States
- Died: December 24, 1992 (aged 37) Boston, Massachusetts, United States
- Denomination: Anglican; Previously Southern Baptist
- Partner: Kevin McKowen
- Education: Hardin–Simmons University

Robert Williams (July 21, 1955, in Abilene, Texas – December 24, 1992, in Boston, Massachusetts), was the first openly gay male priest whose ordination in the Episcopal Church was acknowledged beforehand by the ordaining diocese and was consequently the subject of considerable publicity. Ellen Barrett, openly lesbian, had been ordained a priest by Paul Moore, Bishop of New York, in January 1977 and this was reported in The New York Times. There had been numerous ordinations of men and, after 1976, women whose homosexuality was known to their bishops and Commissions on Ministry but which were not publicly acknowledged. This is what led to widespread misreporting of the Williams ordination.

== Biography ==
Williams, raised a Southern Baptist was a graduate of Hardin–Simmons University in Abilene, Texas, and subsequently worked as a journalist in Dallas. He founded a branch of IntegrityUSA, a gay and lesbian Episcopalian organization. He took a Masters of Divinity at Episcopal Divinity School, graduating in 1988. He was ordained on December 16, 1989, by John Shelby Spong, Bishop of Newark, having publicly stated that he was in a sexual homosexual relationship with James Skelley, a divorced father of two. He was appointed as founding head of The Oasis, an outreach for homosexuals at All Saints’ Church Hoboken, New Jersey.

The appointment caused a great deal of controversy, and in January 1990 Williams stated 'Monogamy is as unnatural as celibacy. If people want to try, O.K., but the fact is, people are not monogamous. It is crazy to hold up this ideal and pretend it's what we're doing and we're not', adding that Mother Teresa would have benefited from having sex. He said of his exposure to heterosexuals that "in my pastoral relationships I find that very few people are monogamous individuals" and "I can't say anything good about celibacy. I think it comes out of a sex-negative philosophy." Williams was forced to resign from his ministry as a result of his comments.

He embarked upon a study of human sexuality at New York University, moving to Provincetown, Massachusetts when he began suffering from the complications of AIDS. He sought to establish an Episcopalian healing ministry there in June 1991, but was denied a license by the Rt Reverend David Johnson, Bishop of Massachusetts. He chose to run his healing ministry independently. He died in hospital in Boston on December 24, 1992, from AIDS, being survived by his partner Kevin McKowen.

== Bibliography ==
- Williams, Robert. Just As I Am: A Practical Guide to Being Out, Proud, and Christian. New York: Crown, 1992 ISBN 978-0517585399
