= Geez (disambiguation) =

Geez may refer to:

- Geʽez, an ancient and now extinct South Semitic language from the Horn of Africa
- Geʽez script, an abugida used to write Afro-Asiatic languages from the Horn of Africa
- Geez, a form of the slang term Geez, referencing Jesus and used in shock
- Geez (magazine)

== See also ==
- Afroasiatic languages
