= St. Mary's School (Knoxville, Illinois) =

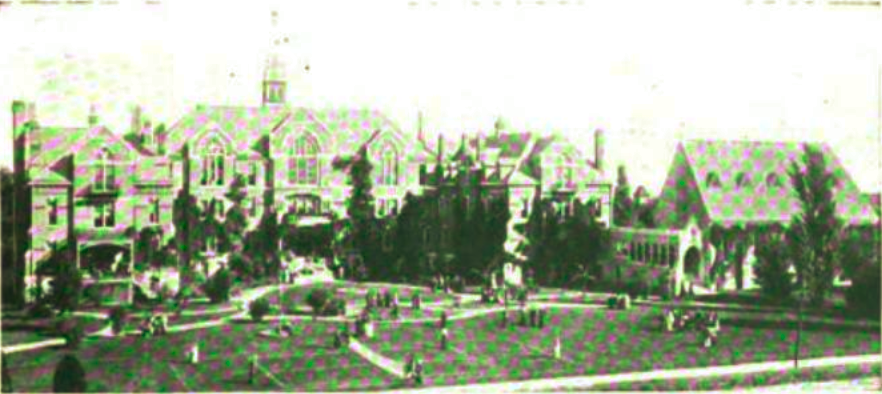
- St. Mary's School (1910)
- Knoxville, Illinois, U.S.

Information
- Former name: Ewing Female University
- Type: parochial girls' school
- Motto: "Blessed are the pure in heart."
- Religious affiliation: Protestant Episcopal Church of Illinois
- Established: April 12, 1868
- Principal: Dr. Charles Wesley Leffingwell, rector
- Gender: Female
- Campus size: 4 acres (1.6 ha)

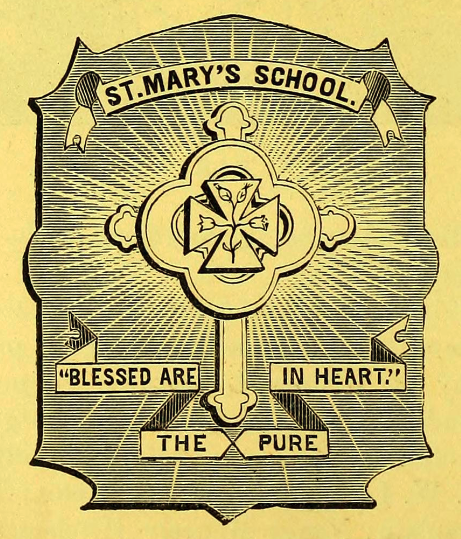
Logo

St. Mary's School (formerly, Ewing Female University; 1868-) was an American parochial girls' school located in Knoxville, Illinois. It opened in April 1868, in the building of the Ewing Female University, erected about ten years before. For lack of endowment, that institution had been compelled to discontinue its work, and the property was transferred to the Episcopal diocese of Illinois. Of the fifteen trustees, ten were appointed to represent the diocese of Illinois and five to represent Knox county. The Rev. Charles Wesley Leffingwell became the founder and rector of St. Mary's, Mrs. Leffingwell being the matron and Miss Nancy Menedy Hitchcock the vice-principal. Dr. Leffingwell continued for 52 years as rector of the school; Mrs. Leffingwell was matron for 40 years; Miss Hitchcock was vice-principal for over 25 years. This institution was entirely rebuilt and refurnished in 1883, at a cost of over US$100,000. Chapel, cloister, and other improvements were added.

St. Mary's was a school for young women who wanted to continue their education two or three years beyond the course of the high school. It was a school home where young women systematically trained for the duties of becoming a wife and mother, where they are encouraged to recognize, and where they were required to prepare for, their present and future obligations. There was also a thorough preparatory high school course and an affiliated institution, St. Martha's School for Younger Girls, for girls up to age 13.

More than 20 states were represented by the teachers and students in attendance. The alumnae were resident in many countries of the world, including Alaska, Mexico, Canada, on the Atlantic and Pacific coasts, in Europe, Australia, Hawaii, the Philippines, Guam, Japan, China, Ceylon and the West Indies.

== Predecessor ==
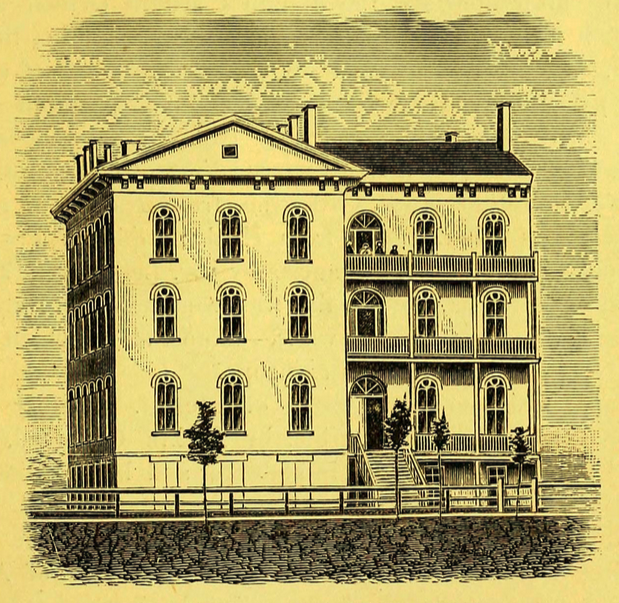
Ewing Female University

In February, 1859, the Illinois State Legislature chartered Ewing Female University, of Knoxville. This institution was named in honor of an old resident of that city. A building was erected in 1858, and for several years, or until 1867, it was conducted in the interests of education under the name of Ewing Female University. Mistress Dyer and Miss Antoinette Proseus were Principals of the schools during these years. The number of scholars in 1865 were: Collegiate Department, 22; Preparatory Department, 68; Art Department, 15; Total, 105. Ewing University failed to meet with the success that an institution of its pronounced intention deserved, and accordingly, in 1869, it was closed and never re-opened.

== History ==
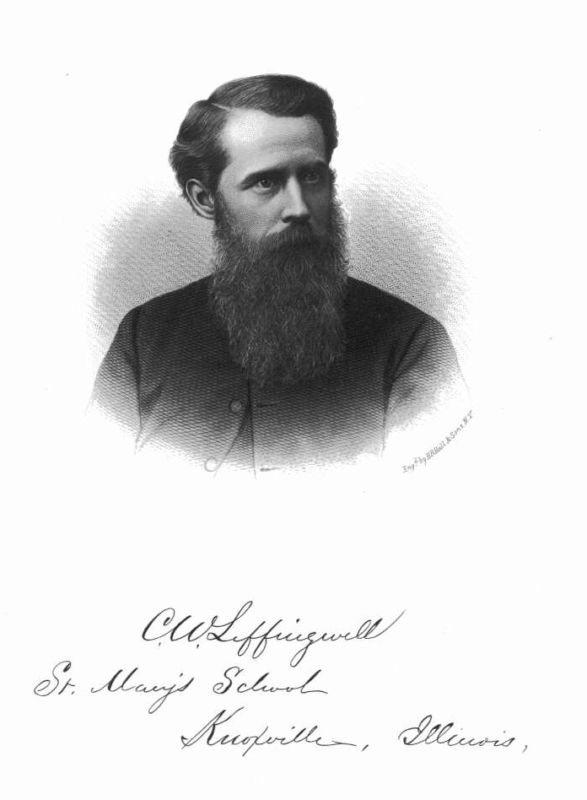
Charles W. Leffingwell

The stockholders, realizing the importance of having a school where their daughters and other young women of the West might receive all the advantages afforded by the best of schools, tendered the institution to the Protestant Episcopal Church of Illinois. The proffered building was accepted, and immediately preparations were made for opening the school under a new and different management. Dr. Charles Wesley Leffingwell was called to the Rectorship of the new institution, which was christened "St. Mary's School". After making some needed changes and improvements in the building, St. Mary's School was opened April 12, 1868, with three boarding pupils and a few day scholars.

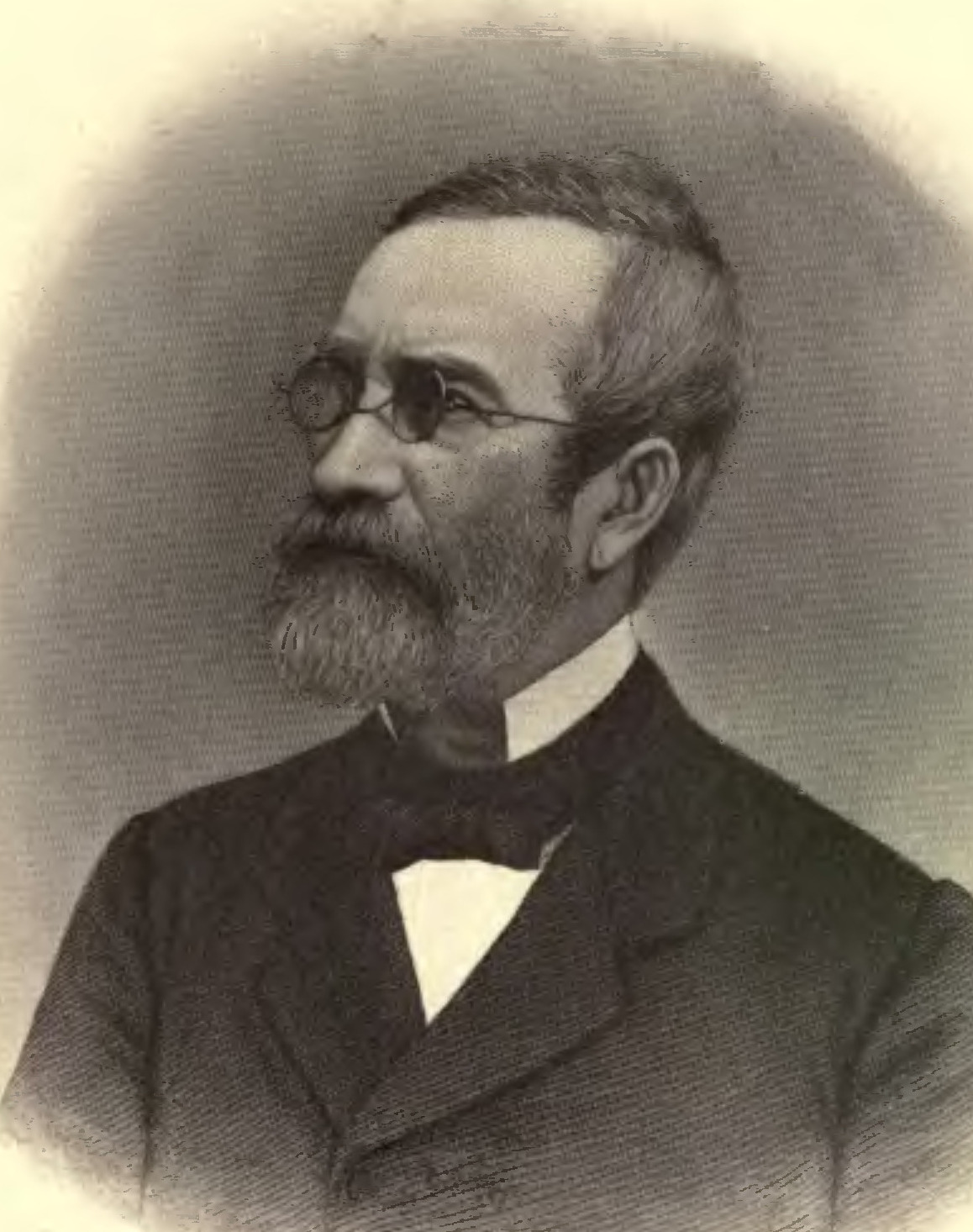
James Knox

By 1878, the number of pupils increased to 99, only 24 of whom resided in Knoxville. The corps of four teachers, grew to 12, including the officers. The school prospered so well that within four years it outgrew its accommodations, and received from the Hon. James Knox a gift of US$11,000, for enlargement of the building. Accordingly, in 1872 an addition was erected doubling the capacity of the room. In addition to this, US$25,000 was expended in the improvement of the property. In 1878, the building and outfit were valued at US$75,000, and another extension was required to complete the architectural plan and to provide for the increase of pupils. For this purpose Mr. Knox bequeathed US$10,000 on the condition that an equal sum be raised by the friends of the school. The annual cost of running the school was US$20,000, and as there was no endowment fund, that amount was raised from scholarships, and so forth.

In 1871, Kappa Kappa Gamma chartered its Beta chapter at St. Mary's School.

On January 4, 1883, the building and contents were destroyed by fire. Within a month the school was reopened in the building of Ansgari College, in Knoxville, the few college students finding homes in private houses and reciting in the rooms of the old court house. The cost of the new school building, the new stone chapel and the improvement of the ground was about US$100,000, of which nearly one-half was provided by the legacy of Mr. Knox. Additions and improvements were made from time to time. In 1901, a recreation annex was built and furnished at a cost of nearly US$10,000.

By 1915, St. Martha's School for Little Girls, situated on its own estate of 12 acres (4.9 ha), became affiliated with St. Mary's School.

== Grounds ==
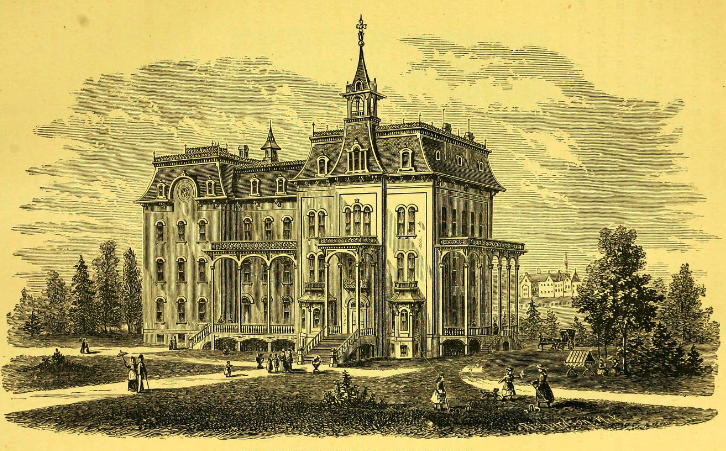
St. Mary's School (1878)

The school building was situated on a 4 acres (1.6 ha) lot, on the corner of Douglas and Market streets, Knoxville. The grounds were set with flowers, shrubbery, fruit and shade trees. The location of the school was removed from the excitement and interruptions of large cities, while at the same time, it was very accessible, being near the convergence of several great lines of travel.

== Administration ==
Dr. Leffingwell served as rector for 52 years, but to Rev. J. S. Chamberlain was due the inception of the plan of founding a parochial school in Knoxville, he having made the first negotiation for the school property in behalf of the Diocese. The majority of trustees were elected by the Episcopal Synod of Illinois.

Succeeding Miss Hitchcock as principal, Miss Emma Pease Howard continued in office and for some years, successfully managed the business as well as the academical work of the institution.

== Education ==
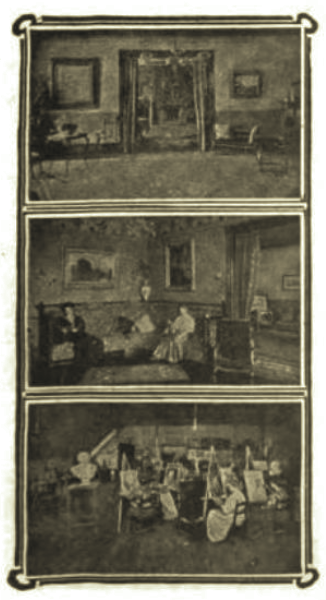
(1912)

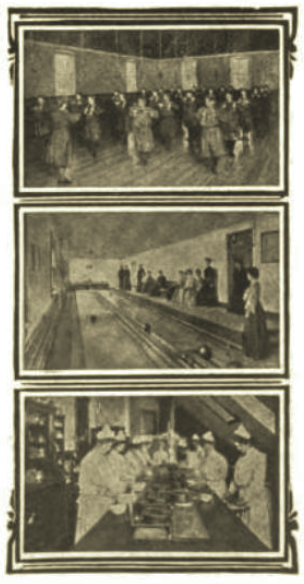
(1912)

The aim of the school was to provide for girls of the West the best advantages for thorough intellectual training, combined with social culture and Christian influence. The course of instruction was comprised in seven departments, requiring four years for its completion, after the preparatory studies were finished. They were History, Literature, Language, Mathematics, Science, Sacred Studies, Music and the Arts of Design. These branches were taught by an able faculty.

The requirements for graduation at St. Mary's are high. Diplomas and Degrees were given; special and selected courses were provided. Special attention was given to "Physical Culture".

The maximum of 100 students in residence, with 20 officers and teachers, was reported during most of the time for a quarter of a century.

== Architecture and fittings ==
The size of the building was 110 by 75 feet (34 m × 23 m). It was of a modern style of architecture, light, showy, convenient, and was four stories and basement in height, including the story in the Mansard roof. Over the main entrance was a belfry, surmounted by a cross which was 100 feet (30 m) from the ground.

The house was divided into 50 rooms, all of which were large, well ventilated, amply lit, and furnished well. On the first floor, they were frescoed, and finished in ash and walnut. They were warmed by hot-air furnaces and steam radiators. All conveniences for school and family were under one roof. The private rooms were so arranged that each girl had a sleeping apartment to herself. Each group of three or four alcoves had a private parlor adjoining.

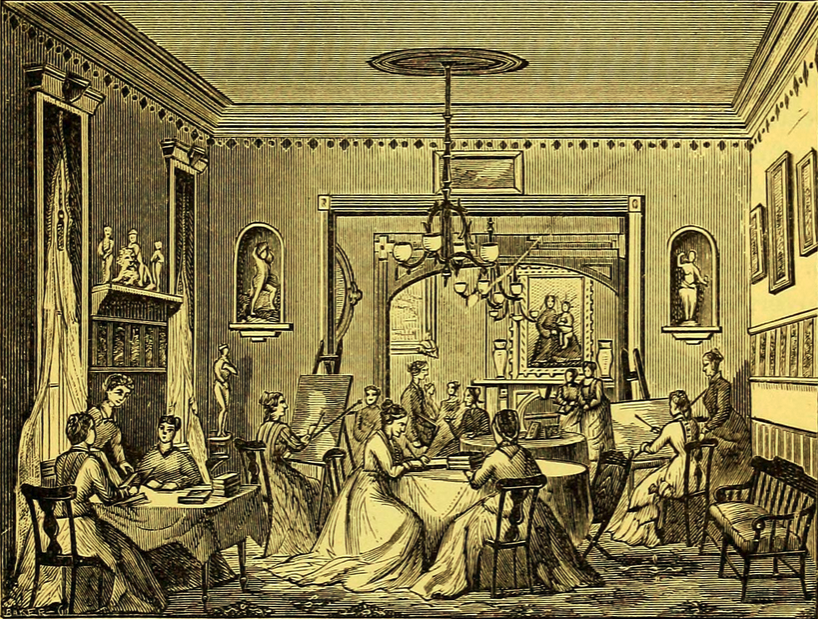
Studio

Many of the rooms were elaborately furnished. Among those more particularly noticeable were the Rector's studio (which alone cost US$1,200 to fit up), the reception parlor, the art studio, library and study hall. These were adorned with many rare works of art, among the principal of which were, a copy of Bartolomé Esteban Murillo's Madonna and Child of the Napkin, from the Pitti Palace, Florence, Italy (this copy was the size of the original, and was encased in a richly-carved Florentine frame); a copy of Correggio's Mystic Marriage of Saint Catherine, from Naples; a portrait of James Knox, copied from George Peter Alexander Healy; copies of Fra Angelico on gold; pen drawing of George Washington by Dr. Leffingwell; and a copy of Raphael's St. Cecilia. Other rare works of art also grace the walls, almost all of which were procured by Dr. Leffingwell while in Europe.

In statuary were also some works of interest. Among them were original statues in Carrara marble, by Larkin G. Mead, Florence, Italy; and numerous statuettes in alabaster and lava, copies from old masters.

There library contained 1,500 volumes. Among them was a complete set of Audubon's Birds and Quadrupeds of America, as well as some elegant volumes of photographs of European scenes collected by the Rector.

The building contained cabinets of geological specimens and fine collections of stuffed birds. Among the relics was the working model from which the first river gun-boats of the world were constructed. This relic of American enterprise was presented by Captain James Laning, who assisted in the construction of the fleet, and commanded one of the ships on the Mississippi River. The school was well furnished with musical instruments. There was a pipe organ, costing US$1,000, and seven pianos, costing in the aggregate US$3,000.

== St. Martha's School for Younger Girls ==
St. Martha's School for Younger Girls was opened by Miss Emma Pease Howard in Knoxville in September 1911. The building was designed and constructed expressly for this work and was located upon a campus adjacent to St. Mary's School, with which institution St. Martha's was affiliated. The school was entirely distinct from St. Mary's, being complete in equipment and especially adapted in methods and management to the care and training of young children. The official visitors were the Rt. Rev. M. E. Fawcett, D. D., Ph.D., Bishop of Quincy, and the Rev. C. W. Leffingwell, D. D., rector of St. Mary's school. A corps of officers and teachers was provided, and everything possible was done to promote the physical, mental and moral welfare of younger girls. Healthful recreation was a prominent feature of the curriculum. The course of study included all branches taught in the public schools preparatory to the eighth grade, with instruction also in French and German, drawing, music, dancing, arts and industries.

It was a unique and interesting development in educational enterprise, being the only school of high grade, which at the time was completely organized and equipped for the care of young girls exclusively. Only those under thirteen years of age were received.

== Notable alumni ==
- Dorothy Ayer Gardner Ford
