= James Knox (Illinois politician) =

American politician

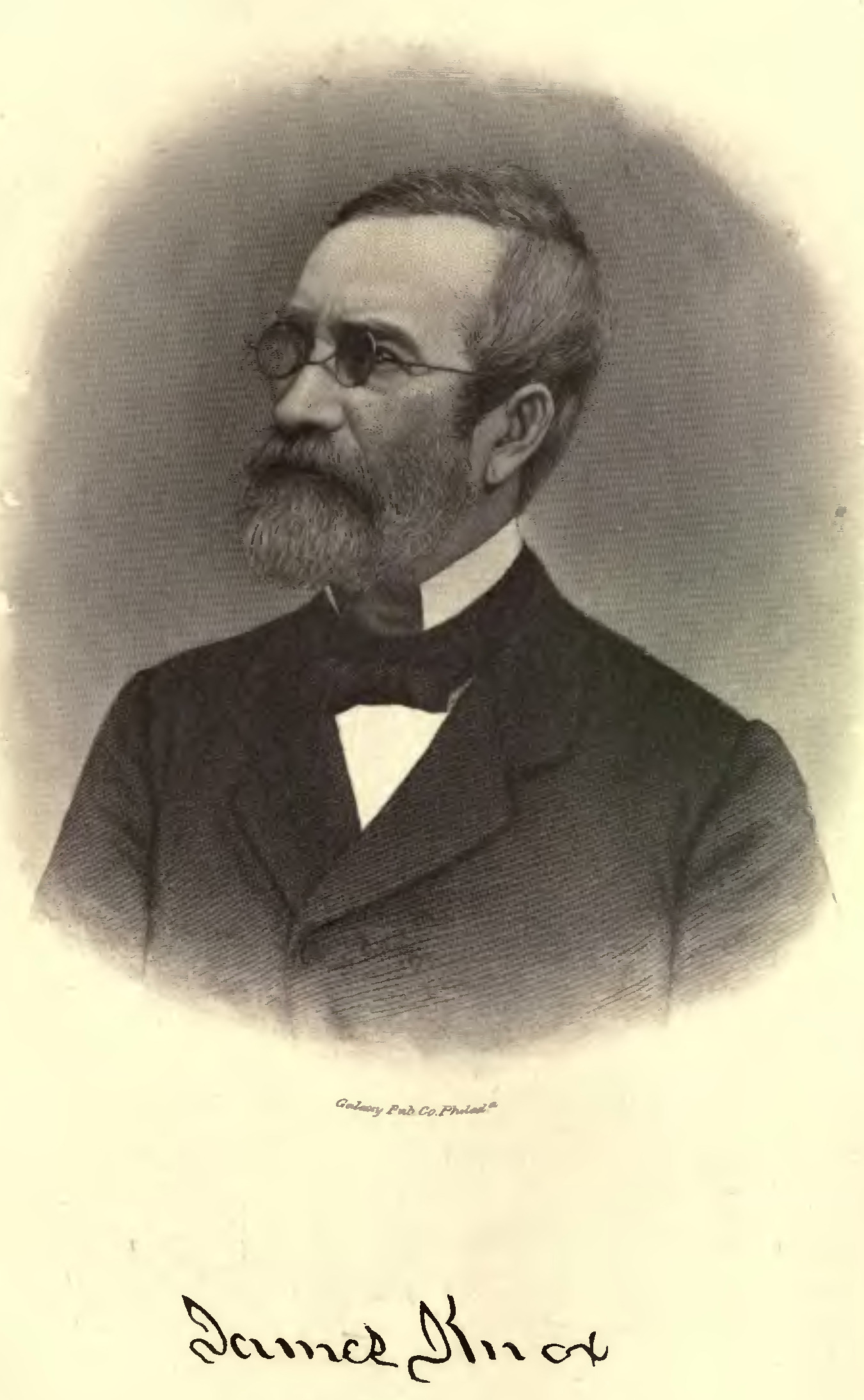

Member of the U.S. House of Representatives from Illinois's 4th district
- In office March 4, 1853 – March 3, 1857
- Preceded by: Richard S. Molony
- Succeeded by: William Kellogg

Personal details
- Born: July 4, 1807 Canajoharie, New York, U.S.
- Died: October 8, 1876 (aged 69) Knoxville, Illinois, U.S.
- Party: Whig

James Knox (July 4, 1807 – October 8, 1876) was a U.S. representative from Illinois.

Born in Canajoharie, New York, Knox was the son of James and Nancy (Ehle) Knox.

Knox entered the Sophomore class of Hamilton College, Clinton, New York, in 1827, and a year later entered the corresponding class at Yale College, the former institution having been temporarily broken up by dissensions. After graduation from Yale in 1830, he studied law with William. H. Maynard and Joshua A. Spencer, in Utica, New York. He was admitted to the bar in 1833 and after May's death became the partner of Spencer.

He moved to Illinois in 1836 and settled in Knoxville, Illinois, Knox County, Illinois, with one of his brothers, whose ill-health soon threw on him an extensive mercantile business, so that his law-practice was abandoned. In the winter of 1841, he was married to Prudence H. Blish, of Wethersfield, Illinois, whose death in 1846 so depressed him that he undertook a variety of additional employments as a relief. He became the proprietor and occasional editor of the village newspaper, engaged extensively in farming, and established a very thriving business in the manufacture of agricultural implements.

In 1846 he was an unsuccessful candidate for US Congress. He served as delegate to the State constitutional convention in 1847. Knox was elected as a Whig to the Thirty-third Congress in and reelected to the Thirty-fourth Congress (March 4, 1853 – March 3, 1857). He served as chairman of the Committee on Roads and Canals (Thirty-fourth Congress).

Owing to failing eyesight, he went to Europe in October 1859, and after a successful operation for cataract returned in January 1861. In September 1865, he again visited Europe for an operation on his eyes, and remained until May, 1869; and in 1872-3 made a third foreign visit. He died in Knoxville, after an illness of two weeks, October 9, 1876, aged 69 years. He had no children. He was interred in City Cemetery.

From his ample estate he gave during his lifetime the sum of $10,000 to Yale, $20,000 to Hamilton College, and upwards of $30,000 to educational institutions in his adopted county, including St. Mary's School. He also left in his last will a further sum of money for the promotion of education. The degree of Doctor of Laws was conferred on him by Hamilton College in 1862.

U.S. House of Representatives
Preceded by Richard S. Molony	Member of the U.S. House of Representatives from Illinois's 4th congressional district 1853-1857	Succeeded by William Kellogg
