= A New Christianity for a New World =

2001 book by John Shelby Spong

- Author: John Shelby Spong
- Language: English
- Subject: Christian theology
- Published: September 18, 2001 Harper San Francisco
- Publication place: United States
- Media type: Print (Hardcover)
- Pages: 276
- ISBN: 978-0-060-67084-9

A New Christianity for a New World: Why Traditional Faith Is Dying and How a New Faith Is Being Born is a theological book by Episcopalian bishop John Shelby Spong, published in 2001, in which he outlines his ideas for doctrinal changes within Christianity in the modern world.

== Challenges to Christian teaching ==
The book was controversial when it was first published because it proposed to entirely re-invent core areas of Christian teaching, such as fundamental theology, Christology, hamartiology, Mariology, biblical theology, natural theology, hermeneutics, theodicy, eschatology and moral theology, instead of simply making cosmetic pastoral reforms within Christianity.

== New Reformation ==
Spong has also been a strong proponent of feminism, gay rights, and racial equality within both Christianity and society at large. Towards these ends, he calls for a new Reformation, in which many of Christianity's basic doctrines should be reformulated.

Martin Luther ignited the Reformation of the 16th century by nailing to the door of the church in Wittenberg in 1517 the 95 Theses that he wished to debate. I will publish this challenge to Christianity in The Voice. I will post my theses on the Internet and send copies with invitations to debate them to the recognized Christian leaders of the world. My theses are far smaller in number than were those of Martin Luther, but they are far more threatening theologically. The issues to which I now call the Christians of the world to debate are these:

== 12 Points for Reform ==
1. Theism, as a way of defining God, is dead. So most theological God-talk is today meaningless. A new way to speak of God must be found.
2. Since God can no longer be conceived in theistic terms, it becomes nonsensical to seek to understand Jesus as the incarnation of the theistic deity. So the Christology of the ages is bankrupt.
3. The Biblical story of the perfect and finished creation from which human beings fell into sin is pre-Darwinian mythology and post-Darwinian nonsense.
4. The virgin birth, understood as literal biology, makes Christ's divinity, as traditionally understood, impossible.
5. The miracle stories of the New Testament can no longer be interpreted in a post-Newtonian world as supernatural events performed by an incarnate deity.
6. The view of the cross as the sacrifice for the sins of the world is a barbarian idea based on primitive concepts of God and must be dismissed.
7. Resurrection is an action of God. Jesus was raised into the meaning of God. It therefore cannot be a physical resuscitation occurring inside human history.
8. The story of the Ascension assumed a three-tiered universe and is therefore not capable of being translated into the concepts of a post-Copernican space age.
9. There is no external, objective, revealed standard written in scripture or on tablets of stone that will govern our ethical behavior for all time.
10. Prayer cannot be a request made to a theistic deity to act in human history in a particular way.
11. The hope for life after death must be separated forever from the behavior control mentality of reward and punishment. The Church must abandon, therefore, its reliance on guilt as a motivator of behavior.
12. All human beings bear God's image and must be respected for what each person is. Therefore, no external description of one's being, whether based on race, ethnicity, gender or sexual orientation, can properly be used as the basis for either rejection or discrimination.

== Role of Judas in the Gospels ==
Spong holds fundamentally that the expanding detail given to Judas' betrayal from the synoptic gospels through to the Gospel of John is a result of active embellishment on behalf of those authors postdating Mark and the Q source, as a result of ideological tension resulting from initially unforeseen and increasing hostility between Jews and Christians in the early history of the church.

== Criticisms ==
=== Gerald O'Collins ===
Gerald O'Collins, Professor of Fundamental Theology, Gregorian University, Rome, argued that Spong’s "work simply does not belong to the world of international scholarship. No genuine scholar will be taken in by this book. ... What is said about a key verb St. Paul uses in Galatians 1:15f. shows that the bishop [Spong] has forgotten any Greek that he knew. [Spong argued his case based on a Greek word that is not in the passage] ... [my] advice for his next book is to let some real experts check it before publication."

=== Rowan Williams ===
Rowan Williams wrote a response to Spong's 12 points in 1998, when he was the Bishop of Monmouth. Williams wrote that "... I cannot in any way see Bishop Spong's theses as representing a defensible or even an interesting Christian future. And I want to know whether the Christian past scripture and tradition, really appears to him as empty and sterile as this text suggests."

Spong himself responds to this criticism by saying many of William's points are invalid and that they are already answered in Spong's book Why Christianity Must Change Or Die from which the 12 theses are drawn and explained.
