= Geez (magazine) =

Religious quarterly magazine

Geez Magazine
- Editor: Lydia Wylie-Kellerman
- Categories: religious, social justice activism
- Frequency: Quarterly
- First issue: Fall 2005
- Company: Geez Press Inc.
- Country: United States of America
- Based in: Detroit, Michigan
- Language: English
- Website: www.geezmagazine.org

Geez is an independent quarterly magazine dealing with issues of spirituality, social justice, religion, and progressive cultural politics. The byline of Geez was "holy mischief in an age of fast faith". In 2015 the byline was changed to "contemplative cultural resistance". Geez is based in Detroit and distributes in Canada, the U.S., and abroad.

Geez was founded in Winnipeg, Manitoba, in 2005 by Aiden Enns and Will Braun. Geez looks at religion, spirituality, and politics through the eyes of its readers. Geez is known for its pointed illustrations, graphics and unique combination of satire, critique, social consciousness, and quirkiness. The magazine says it's for "people at the fringes of faith".

== History ==
The founder of Geez magazine, Aiden Enns, originally had the idea of the magazine in 2003 while he was working as managing editor at Adbusters in Vancouver. Enns then moved to Winnipeg and recruited writer and activist Will Braun who came on board as co-editor and co-publisher. The graphic design for the magazine is done by Darryl Brown. Geez has hosted annual sermon contests.

Aiden Enns founded the Buy Nothing Christmas movement. He has encouraged participation in the anti-consumerist movement throughout his career at Geez.

The first issue of Geez was published in Fall 2005 with an initial 500 paying subscribers and no advertising revenue. In the first year, the number of subscribers climbed to 2,000. In 2009, Geez moved its hub from Enns' home to a community-minded church in Winnipeg's inner-city (Knox United Church).

From the beginning, the aim of Geez was to "put the 'geez' into Jesus." A religious magazine for a new generation of Christians and post-Christians, the magazine wanted a short, provocative name that risked offending more conservative readers. Some consider the name blasphemous because it is an expletive derived from the name of Jesus.

In 2019, Geez relocated to Detroit, Michigan. Aiden Enns stepped down from his position as the editor and Lydia Wylie-Kellermann filled the role. In February 2024, the Geez editorial board announced that the upcoming 73rd issue would be the final one, citing insufficient revenue.

== Awards ==
Awards and nominations for Geez
Year	Ceremony	Category	Result	Ref.
2007	Canada's Western Magazine Awards	Magazine of the Year Award	Won	
2008	Canadian Church Press	General Excellence	Won	
2009	Canadian Church Press	A.C Forrest Memorial Award	Won	
2009	UNTE Independent Press Awards	Best Spiritual Coverage	Won	
2010	Associated Church Press	Best in Class	Won	
2011	Canadian Church Press	Service Journalism	Won	
2013	Canadian Church Press	Best poetry	Won	
2013	Canadian Church Press	Original illustration	Won	
2013	Canadian Church Press	Layout and design of an issue	Won	
2013	Canadian Church Press	Photography	Won	
2020	Associated Church Press	Award of Merit for Best in Class for National/International Magazine	Won	
2020	Associated Church Press	Award of Excellence for theme issue (Geez 54: Climate Justice)	Won	
2020	Associated Church Press	Award of Excellence for interview (with Siwatu-Salama Ra in Geez 53: Mothering)	Won	
2020	Associated Church Press	Award of Merit for personal experience (article by Lucia Wylie-Eggert in Geez 53: Mothering)	Won	
2020	Associated Church Press	Honourable Mention for editorial (by Lydia Wylie-Kellermann in Geez 54: Climate Justice)	Won	
2020	Associated Church Press	Honourable Mention for letters to the editor	Won	
2020	Associated Church Press	Honourable mention for photography (in Geez 54: Climate Justice)	Won	
2020	Associated Church Press	Honourable Mention for podcast/audio series (Geez Out Loud)	Won	
