= Knoxville, Illinois =

- City
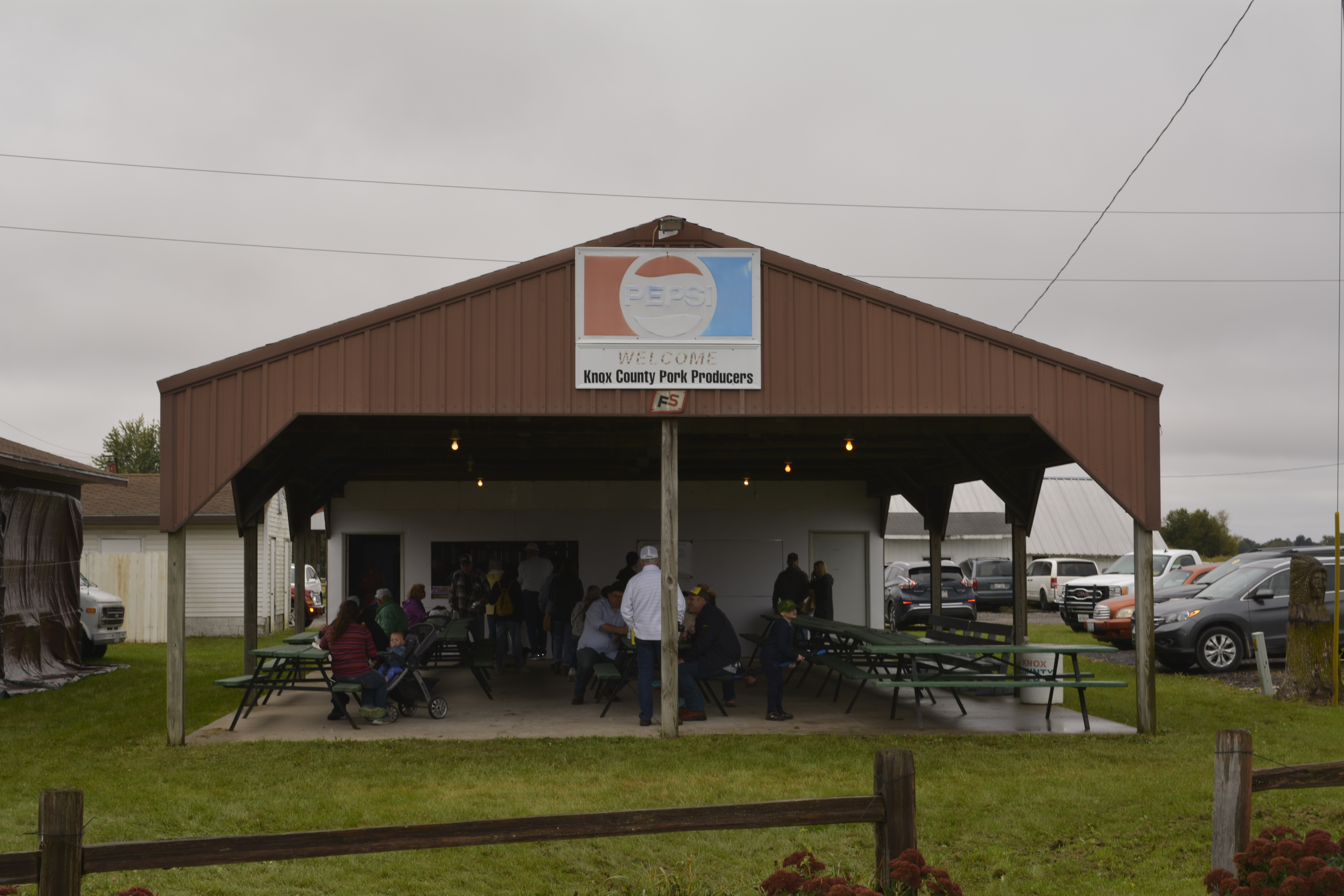
- Knox County Pork Producers Building
- Nickname: K-ville
- Location of Knoxville in Knox County, Illinois.
- Coordinates: 40°54′25″N 90°17′09″W
- Country: United States
- State: Illinois
- County: Knox
- Township: Knox
- Founded: 1831
- Founder: James Knox

Area
  - Total: 2.35 sq mi (6.09 km^{2})
  - Land: 2.35 sq mi (6.09 km^{2})
  - Water: 0 sq mi (0.00 km^{2})
- Elevation: 764 ft (233 m)

Population (2020)
  - Total: 2,901
  - Density: 1,234.7/sq mi (476.71/km^{2})
- Time zone: UTC-6 (CST)
  - Summer (DST): UTC-5 (CDT)
- ZIP Code(s): 61448
- Area code: 309
- FIPS code: 17-40416
- GNIS feature ID: 2395558
- Website: kville.org

Knoxville is a city in Knox County, Illinois, United States. The population was 2,901 at the 2020 census. It is part of the Galesburg Micropolitan Statistical Area

Knoxville is located just southeast of the City of Galesburg. There is a public square in the center of town with several historic buildings surrounding it including Knox County's first courthouse, city hall, the Ball log cabin, the town gallows, and several other important buildings. The Knox County Fairgrounds is just north of Knoxville on Henderson Road. Knoxville is served with two exits on Interstate 74, at U.S. Highway 150 east of town and at Henderson Road north of town. U.S. Highway 150 runs east and west through Knoxville and serves as the main business thoroughfare. Illinois Route 97 and Knox County Highway 8 also enter the city. The Knoxville Cemetery lies in the northern part of town on Market Street. The Knox County Nursing Home is located in the city. There is a grade school in Knoxville, as well as a Junior High and a High School (KHS). Among the "attractions" in Knoxville are the historic buildings, Walnut Grove Farm and Rattle Toes exhibit, the Knox County Fair held in August, and the annual Knox County Scenic Drive held in October.

== History ==
Knoxville was established on January 15, 1831, and called Henderson until its name was changed to Knoxville on December 22, 1832, when it became the county seat. It was one of the first 10 municipalities incorporated in the state and is the oldest town in Knox County. James Knox was a notable early resident.

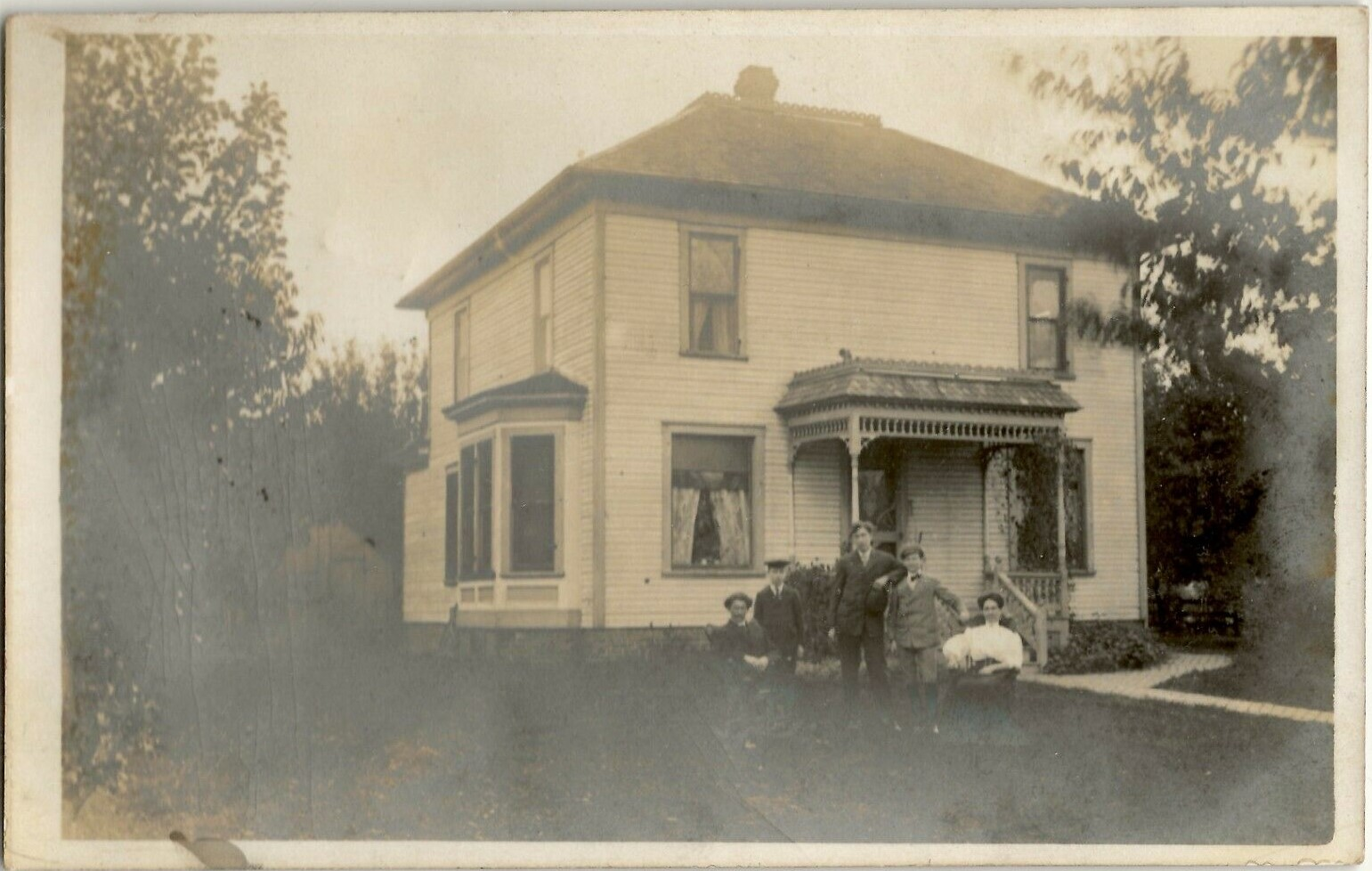
A house seen on a postcard sent from Knoxville in 1908

Knoxville was the county seat until 1873, when the county seat was moved to Galesburg. The first Knox County Courthouse, completed in 1839, and second Knox County jail, completed in 1845, still stand in Knoxville and are registered on the National Register of Historic Places. The two buildings and Knoxville's first general store, the Sanburn Log Cabin, built in 1832, have been restored and are open to the public. The county's Hall of Records, built in 1854, is used as Knoxville's City Hall.

The log cabin of John G. Sanburn was not discovered until decades after his death, when it was nearly destroyed. In 1832, Sanburn settled in Knoxville to open the first shop, which also served as the first post office. He was the first county clerk, circuit clerk, Indian master, and probate judge, as well as shopkeeper and postmaster. Years later, as the house built around Sanburn's cabin was being demolished, a nosey neighbor spied the underlying log structure and alerted the authorities. At that time the owner of the property, Bernice LaFollette, donated the cabin to the city as a museum.

Typical log cabins like Sanburn's measured about 14' x 14' wide and 7'-8' high with 9" walnut lincoln logs, wooden door hinges, and clapboard shingles. The entire area of Sanburn's cabin and general store served as a kitchen while encased in Johnson's home. A restoration in 1964 insured proper security and insulation that Sanburn did not enjoy in the 1830s, including glass windows and cement sealant to replace clay and hay between logs.

The cabin contains general store memorabilia for display and a picture of an 1852 penny discovered in the foundation when the house was moved from the south to the north side of the square for restoration. The John G Sanburn Log Cabin is maintained by the Knox County Historic Sites. It is open for public view during the first two weekends in October for the Knox County Scenic Drive and from 2-4 p.m. Sundays, May–September.

In 1868, St. Mary's School opened on the site where the Ewing Female University had previously been located.

The Old Knox County Jail was the location of the only legal hanging in Knox County when John Osborne was hanged March 14, 1873, for the murder and sodomy of Adelia M. Mathews, Yates City.

Abraham Lincoln stayed in Knoxville on his way to his debate with Stephen A. Douglas at Knox College in 1858. The hotel that he spent the night in was demolished but a plaque on the building currently at the site commemorates the occasion.

== Geography ==
According to the 2021 census gazetteer files, Knoxville has a total area of 2.35 square miles (6.09 km^{2}), all land.

=== Climate ===
Climate data for Knoxville, Illinois (1991–2020 normals, extremes 1897–present)
Month	Jan	Feb	Mar	Apr	May	Jun	Jul	Aug	Sep	Oct	Nov	Dec	Year
Record high °F (°C)	68 (20)	71 (22)	81 (27)	88 (31)	94 (34)	99 (37)	108 (42)	100 (38)	100 (38)	92 (33)	78 (26)	70 (21)	108 (42)
Mean daily maximum °F (°C)	31.6 (−0.2)	36.1 (2.3)	48.8 (9.3)	61.5 (16.4)	72.0 (22.2)	81.2 (27.3)	83.6 (28.7)	82.0 (27.8)	76.3 (24.6)	63.8 (17.7)	49.3 (9.6)	36.4 (2.4)	60.2 (15.7)
Daily mean °F (°C)	23.0 (−5.0)	27.1 (−2.7)	38.6 (3.7)	50.5 (10.3)	61.4 (16.3)	70.9 (21.6)	74.1 (23.4)	72.3 (22.4)	65.4 (18.6)	52.8 (11.6)	40.0 (4.4)	28.5 (−1.9)	50.4 (10.2)
Mean daily minimum °F (°C)	14.3 (−9.8)	18.1 (−7.7)	28.5 (−1.9)	39.4 (4.1)	50.8 (10.4)	60.7 (15.9)	64.7 (18.2)	62.6 (17.0)	54.4 (12.4)	41.8 (5.4)	30.7 (−0.7)	20.5 (−6.4)	40.5 (4.7)
Record low °F (°C)	−27 (−33)	−28 (−33)	−8 (−22)	9 (−13)	24 (−4)	36 (2)	42 (6)	43 (6)	19 (−7)	18 (−8)	−6 (−21)	−16 (−27)	−28 (−33)
Average precipitation inches (mm)	2.09 (53)	2.12 (54)	2.64 (67)	3.95 (100)	5.54 (141)	4.61 (117)	4.16 (106)	3.50 (89)	4.18 (106)	3.03 (77)	2.51 (64)	2.17 (55)	40.50 (1,029)
Average snowfall inches (cm)	6.4 (16)	7.7 (20)	3.4 (8.6)	0.4 (1.0)	0.0 (0.0)	0.0 (0.0)	0.0 (0.0)	0.0 (0.0)	0.0 (0.0)	0.2 (0.51)	1.4 (3.6)	5.9 (15)	25.4 (65)
Average precipitation days (≥ 0.01 in)	8.5	8.7	10.1	11.5	13.9	11.8	9.8	9.9	8.1	9.7	8.0	9.4	119.4
Average snowy days (≥ 0.1 in)	4.4	4.2	1.8	0.3	0.0	0.0	0.0	0.0	0.0	0.1	0.6	3.5	14.9
Source: NOAA

== Demographics ==
Historical population
Census	Pop.	Note	%±
1850	798		—
1860	1,567		96.4%
1870	1,883		20.2%
1880	1,600		−15.0%
1890	1,728		8.0%
1900	1,857		7.5%
1910	1,818		−2.1%
1920	1,708		−6.1%
1930	1,867		9.3%
1940	2,241		20.0%
1950	2,209		−1.4%
1960	2,560		15.9%
1970	2,930		14.5%
1980	3,432		17.1%
1990	3,243		−5.5%
2000	3,183		−1.9%
2010	2,911		−8.5%
2020	2,901		−0.3%
U.S. Decennial Census

=== 2020 census ===
As of the 2020 census, Knoxville had a population of 2,901. There were 1,199 households and 737 families residing in the city. The population density was 1,234.47 inhabitants per square mile (476.63/km^{2}). There were 1,291 housing units at an average density of 549.36 per square mile (212.11/km^{2}).

The median age was 44.2 years. 22.3% of residents were under the age of 18 and 25.2% of residents were 65 years of age or older. For every 100 females there were 87.8 males, and for every 100 females age 18 and over there were 83.6 males age 18 and over.

96.9% of residents lived in urban areas, while 3.1% lived in rural areas.

Of Knoxville's households, 28.9% had children under the age of 18 living in them. Of all households, 47.8% were married-couple households, 16.1% were households with a male householder and no spouse or partner present, and 28.9% were households with a female householder and no spouse or partner present. About 30.0% of all households were made up of individuals, and 18.2% had someone living alone who was 65 years of age or older.

Of all housing units, 7.1% were vacant. The homeowner vacancy rate was 1.7% and the rental vacancy rate was 13.0%.

Racial composition as of the 2020 census
Race	Number	Percent
White	2,713	93.5%
Black or African American	24	0.8%
American Indian and Alaska Native	5	0.2%
Asian	4	0.1%
Native Hawaiian and Other Pacific Islander	0	0.0%
Some other race	8	0.3%
Two or more races	147	5.1%
Hispanic or Latino (of any race)	72	2.5%

=== Income and poverty ===
The median income for a household in the city was $63,750, and the median income for a family was $82,591. Males had a median income of $48,250 versus $30,348 for females. The per capita income for the city was $27,526. About 7.2% of families and 6.6% of the population were below the poverty line, including 6.6% of those under age 18 and 7.0% of those age 65 or over.

== Notable people ==
- Robert H. Birch, accomplice in the 1845 torture-murder of Colonel George Davenport
- Charles C. Craig, jurist and politician
- Justina Ford, physician
- Armando Ghitalla, trumpet player with the Boston Symphony and Boston Pops
- Justin Hartley, actor known for roles on Passions, Smallville, and This Is Us
- James Knox, congressman
- Charles Wesley Leffingwell Episcopal priest, writer, and educator
- Ernest de Koven Leffingwell, explorer
- John E. Raker, politician
- James Knox Taylor, architect
- Charles R. Walgreen, founder of Walgreens
- Matt Wilson, world renowned jazz drummer
- Polly Wolfe, Major League Baseball outfielder
