= Living the Questions =

DVD and web-based curriculum

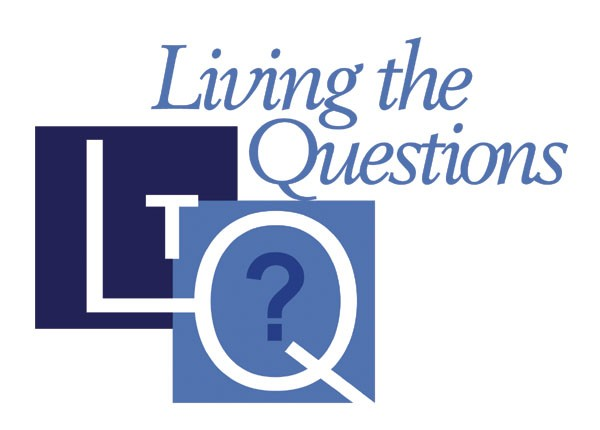
Living the Questions logo

Living the Questions (LtQ) is a “DVD and web-based curriculum" designed to help people evaluate the relevance of Christianity in the 21st century, especially from a progressive Christian perspective.

== Overview ==
LtQ was co-created in the US by the Arizonan United Methodist ministers Jeff Procter-Murphy and David Felten as part of the larger movement of Progressive Christianity. It is distributed online and through several denominational publishing divisions.

As of 2023 the LtQ curriculum is in use in nearly 8000 churches across North America, the United Kingdom, Australia, and New Zealand.

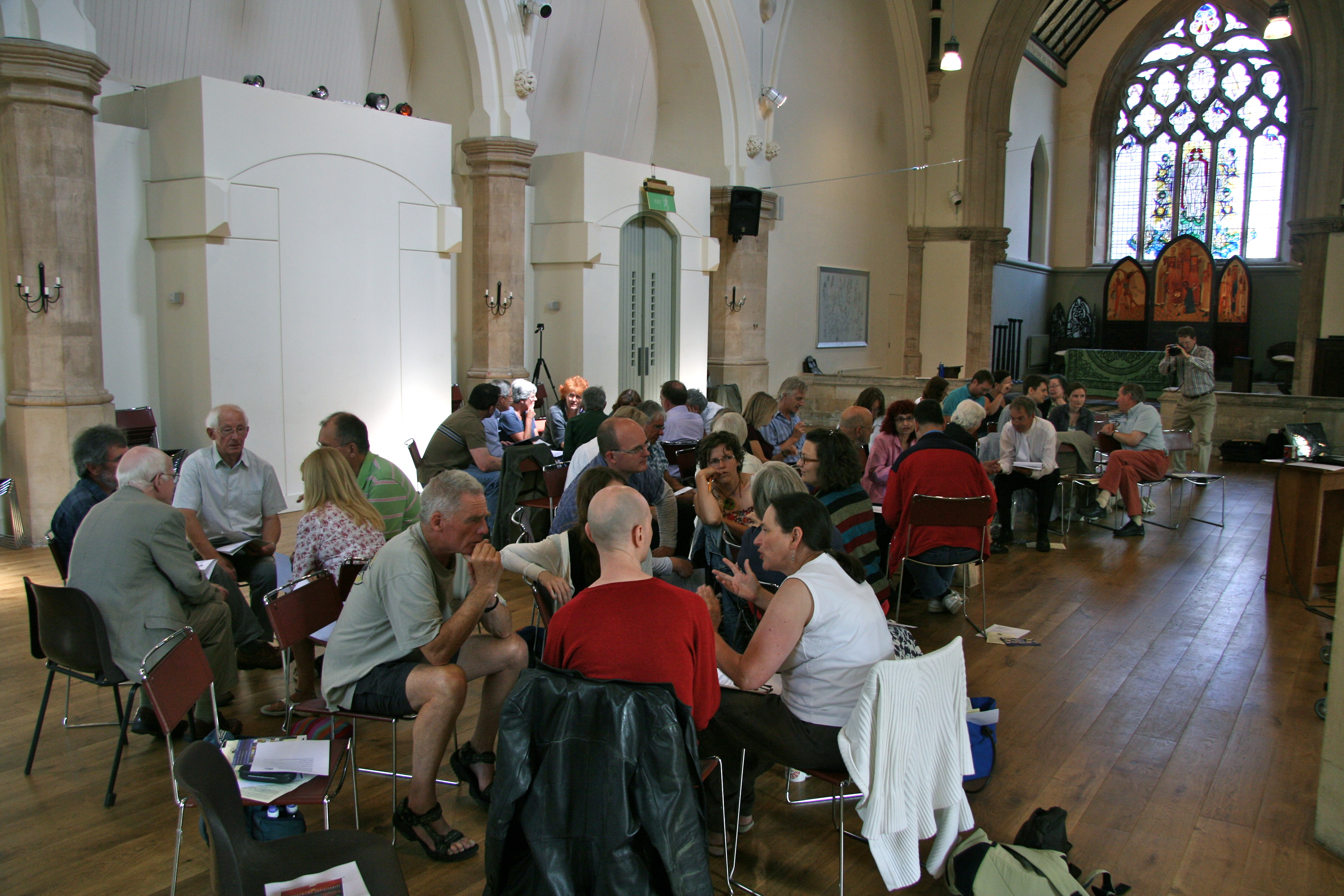
Living the Questions Session at St. Luke's Anglican, North London

== Curriculum ==
The curriculum was original developed for use at Asbury United Methodist and Via de Cristo United Methodist in Arizona. It started out as one DVD series and is now a growing catalogue of curriculum. Units include;

- Living the Questions 2.0: An Introduction to Progressive Christianity
- Saving Jesus Redux
- Eclipsing Empire: Paul, Rome and the Kingdom of God with John Dominic Crossan and Marcus Borg, on location in Turkey
- First Light: Jesus and the Kingdom of God with John Dominic Crossan and Marcus Borg, on location in the Galilee and Jerusalem
- Countering Pharaoh's Production/Consumption Society Today with Walter Brueggemann
- Questioning Capital Punishment with Sr. Helen Prejean
- Tex Mix: Stories of Earthy Mysticism with Tex Sample
- Jesus for the Non-Religious with John Shelby Spong
- Uppity Women of the Bible with Lisa Wolf
- Singing the Unsung with John L. Bell
- DreamThinkBeDo (a remix of LtQ's other work intended for young adults)

LtQ does not offer a systematic theology, but is rather a thematic overview developed from questions raised in local parishes. LtQ seeks to expose lay people to the complex theological questions and perspectives that are taught in seminaries, but that often don't “trickle down” into the local churches.

== Reception ==
Reviewers have called LtQ both “enlightening and inspiring” and “fascinating”, stating that the series raises questions many have “thought about but have been afraid to ask, and topics they know are important but don't hear mentioned in church”.

In her book, Christianity for the Rest of Us, Diana Butler Bass notes that both the LtQ program and its methodology were part of the success of one of her subject churches, Trinity Episcopal Church in Santa Barbara, California.

In Big Christianity: What's Right with the Religious Left, author Jan G. Linn wrote: “Living the Questions is a welcomed … alternative to literalism that has promise in helping Christians find the biblical grounding for Bigger Christianity".

The American mainline Protestant magazine The Christian Century criticized the original 12-session version of LtQ for taking a fundamentalist-like position, “close to a mirror image” of “fundamentalists”.

== Book ==
Based on the LtQ curriculum and written by the series creators, the book Living the Questions: The Wisdom of Progressive Christianity was released by HarperOne (an imprint of HarperCollins) in August 2012.

== Contributors ==
All of the following contributors appear in "Living the Questions 2.0"; some appear in other curricula in the LtQ catalog;

- Nancy Ammerman
- John L. Bell
- Marcus Borg
- Rita Nakashima Brock
- Walter Brueggemann
- Ron Buford
- Minerva G. Carcaño
- John B. Cobb
- John Dominic Crossan
- David Felten
- Yvette Flunder
- James A. Forbes
- Matthew Fox
- Lloyd Geering
- Hans Küng
- Cynthia Langston Kirk
- Amy-Jill Levine
- Megan McKenna
- Pat McMahon
- Culver "Bill" Nelson
- Siyoung Park
- Rebecca Ann Parker
- Stephen Patterson
- Helen Prejean
- Jeff Procter-Murphy
- Barbara Rossing
- Tex Sample
- Elisabeth Schüssler Fiorenza
- Bernard Brandon Scott
- John Shelby Spong
- Emilie Townes
- Rick Ufford-Chase
- Winnie Varghese
- Mel White

The 2010 release of LtQ2's “Home Edition” added the insights of Brian McLaren, Robin Meyers, and Diana Butler Bass.
