= Peter Day =

Peter Day may refer to:

- Peter Day (chemist) (1938–2020), British inorganic chemist
- Peter Day (broadcaster) (1947–2023), British broadcaster on BBC Radio
- Pete Day (born 1970), recording engineer, record producer and songwriter
- Peter Morton Day (1914–1984), journalist and ecumenical leader in the Episcopal Church in the United States
