= Linden H. Morehouse =

American publisher

Linden Husted Morehouse (January 24, 1842 - August 19, 1915) was a major Episcopal publisher. He founded the Young Churchman Company, which published The Young Churchman from 1870, The Shepherd's Arms from 1877, and The Living Church from 1886. The Young Churchman also published The Church Eclectic from 1894 to 1900. Morehouse's descendants Frederic Cook Morehouse and Clifford Phelps Morehouse continued the family tradition of publishing for the Episcopal Church in the United States of America.

The Young Churchman Company changed its name to Morehouse Publishing in 1918.
