= B. J. Stiles =

American activist (born 1933)

B. J. Stiles (born February 6, 1933, in Maypearl, Texas) is an American activist who has made award-winning contributions in several arenas: publishing and communications, civil and human rights, and philanthropy. For example, in 1964 he received an award from the Educational Press Association of America for excellence in educational journalism. He was at the forefront of creating and leading private sector responses to HIV/AIDS in the 1980s and 1990s. His contributions to private sector responses to AIDS were recognized by President George H. W. Bush in a speech delivered in Washington, D.C., on March 29, 1990.

== Journalism career ==
In the 1960s, Stiles was editor-in-chief of motive (magazine), the official publication of the Methodist Student Movement, based in Nashville, TN, and financially underwritten by the United Methodist Church. He brought such nationally recognized authors, artists, and ecumenical leaders as David Halberstam, Corita Kent, Ross Terrill, William Stringfellow, Harvey Cox, and Michael Novak to the pages of the magazine. Among his readers as college students were Hillary Clinton, Richard Celeste, and hundreds of others whose achievements as academics, politicians and public officials, and faith-based leaders attribute their readership of motive as a life-shaping experience. Along with Life (magazine), he received special recognition from Columbia University Graduate School of Journalism in their 1967 Magazine-of-the-Year Awards.

== "Is God Dead?" and Playboy controversies ==
In spring 1966, Stiles published an issue of motive, the back cover of which included a satirical obituary written by Anthony Towne playing off of the then-raging theological controversy, Is God Dead?. The mock headline read:

God is dead in Georgia. Eminent deity succumbs during Surgery — succession in doubt as all creation groans. LBJ orders flags at half staff.

The "obituary" announced that "God, creator of the universe, principal deity of the world's Jews, ultimate reality of Christians, and most eminent of all divinities died late yesterday during major surgery undertaken to correct a massive diminishing influence". The piece also noted that "In Johnson City, Tex., President Johnson, recuperating from his recent gallbladder surgery was described by aides as 'profoundly upset'" and that former President Harry S. Truman, speaking from a barbershop in Kansas City responded: "I'm always sorry to hear someone is dead. It's a damn shame". There was both praise for and opposition to this piece of theological satire throughout the Methodist world. Stiles told the reporter covering the 'God Is Dead' controversy for an Oakland, California newspaper that "people either like 'motive' intensely or dislike it intensely. There's no middle ground".

This was not Stiles' first brush with controversy. In November 1965, an issue of motive published a debate between Playboy editor Hugh Hefner and theologian Harvey Cox entitled "Sex: Myths and Realities". Hefner's references to the "advantages" of premarital sex raised hackles in the Methodist community, and there were calls for the magazine to suspend publication. Stiles responded to the crisis by reminding supporters and detractors of the magazine that: "If churches don't take notice of what students have on their mind and help them think it through, they are missing the boat. Hefner, as Playboy editor, is an influence on the campus. We need not pretend. He exists".

== Robert F. Kennedy relationship ==
His February 1968 editorial ("Wanted: Some Hope for the Future") published in motive, urging Robert F. Kennedy to run for president, received wide comment, and is considered to be one of the factors in Senator Kennedy's decision to run for president, as recorded by Michael Novak in his historical reminiscences of that early phase of the Kennedy campaign. The editorial led to Kennedy's invitation to Stiles to join the Kennedy-for-President Campaign staff. He did so in 1968, stimulating support for Kennedy in the Indiana, Oregon and California primaries. He was with Senator Ted Kennedy in San Francisco on the night of the Robert F. Kennedy assassination in Los Angeles on June 5, 1968, and facilitated expediting the Senator's flight to be with the Kennedy family in Los Angeles. In 1969, at the request of the Kennedy family, he moved to Washington, D.C., to launch and lead the RFK Fellows Program for the Robert F. Kennedy Memorial (now incorporated as the Robert F. Kennedy Human Rights).

== Later non-profit career ==
In the ensuing decade, Stiles was Director of Publications for The Urban Institute; Deputy Chairman of the National Endowment for the Humanities during the Administration of President Jimmy Carter; and Vice President for Communications for the Council on Foundations. As awareness of AIDS dramatically exploded in the early 1980s, Stiles became a consultant and freelance writer and was widely cited in news accounts of the impact of the epidemic on business and labor. Mathilde Krim invited him to work with the AIDS Medical Foundation and, along with other associates of hers, helped form The American Foundation for AIDS Research AmfAR.

In 1987, he cofounded the National Leadership Coalition on AIDS, and served as its president/CEO until that organization merged with the National Community AIDS Partnership in 1997 to form the National AIDS Fund. He subsequently served as the fund's president/CEO until his retirement in 1999. Sandra L. Thurman, then director of the Office of National AIDS Policy at the White House, marked Stiles' retirement by saying, "B.J.'s contributions and leadership to the AIDS fight have been invaluable. His constant support and ballast have allowed so much work to be accomplished. He stayed the course and provided steady and consistent leadership when others' commitment to fighting HIV/AIDS has wavered".

In 2000, he relocated with his domestic partner, Steve McCollom, architect, to San Francisco. Stiles has been actively engaged in Bay Area health and nonprofit organizations since 1999 and has served as an interim executive director for several Bay Area nonprofits, including the AIDS & Breast Cancer Emergency Funds, Operation Access, and the STOP AIDS Project.

Stiles continues to be engaged in several philanthropic undertakings, and in 2007–08 was a consultant for the William and Flora Hewlett Foundation, and the David and Lucile Packard Foundation.

Stiles has been recognized as Distinguished Alumni of Texas Wesleyan University, and honored for his leadership in HIV/AIDS by the U.S. Centers for Disease Control and Prevention. He is a board member of the Global AIDS Alliance; a member of Rotary International, a member of the University Club of Washington, D.C., a member of Funders Concerned About AIDS, and a lifetime member of the Associated Church Press.
