= Richard S. Molony =

American politician

Member of the U.S. House of Representatives from Illinois's 4th district
- In office March 4, 1851 – March 3, 1853
- Preceded by: John Wentworth
- Succeeded by: James Knox

Personal details
- Born: June 28, 1811 Northfield, New Hampshire, U.S.
- Died: December 14, 1891 (aged 80) Humboldt, Nebraska, U.S.
- Party: Democratic

Richard Sheppard Molony (June 28, 1811 – December 14, 1891) was a U.S. representative from Illinois.

Born in Northfield, New Hampshire, Molony studied medicine. He graduated from Dartmouth Medical School, Hanover, New Hampshire, in 1838 and commenced the practice of his profession in Belvidere, Illinois. He served as a delegate to the 1852 Democratic National Convention.

Molony was elected as a Democrat to the 32nd United States Congress (March 4, 1851 – March 3, 1853). He was not a candidate for renomination in 1852. He moved to Humboldt, Nebraska, and engaged in agricultural pursuits from 1866 to 1891. In 1882 he declined the Democratic nomination for United States Senator from Nebraska on account of ill health. He was again a delegate to the Democratic National Convention at Chicago in 1884. He died in Humboldt, Nebraska, on December 14, 1891. He was interred in Belvidere Cemetery, Belvidere, Illinois.

U.S. House of Representatives
Preceded by John Wentworth	Member of the U.S. House of Representatives from Illinois's 4th congressional district 1851-1853	Succeeded by James Knox
