= Carroll Eugene Simcox =

American journalist

Carroll Eugene Simcox (April 14, 1912 – October 16, 2002) was an American Episcopal priest and editor of The Living Church magazine. Simcox was born in Lisbon, North Dakota and educated at the University of North Dakota. He received his master's degree from Oberlin Theological Seminary and later his Doctorate in Classical Philology from the University of Illinois. He was ordained deacon in 1937 and priest in 1938. Simcox was rector of Zion Episcopal Church, Manchester, Vermont, and instructor at Bennington College from 1950 to 1955. In the 1950s he was on the staff of St. Thomas Episcopal Church, Fifth Avenue in New York City. He served as rector of St. Mary's Episcopal Church, Tampa, Florida from 1958 to 1964.

In Vermont, Simcox began a serious writing career. In 1982, he left the Episcopal Church to join the American Episcopal Church, and later served as a priest in the Anglican Church in America.

His wife Georgiana Mantor Simcox (1913-1999) was news editor of The Living Church.

== Bibliography ==
- Living the Creed (Morehouse-Gorham, 1950)
- Living the Ten Commandments (Morehouse Gorham, 1953)
- Living the Lord's Prayer (Morehouse-Gorham, 1955)
- The Words of Our Worship, A Study in Prayer Book Meanings (Morehouse-Gorham, 1955)
- Understanding the Sacraments (Morehouse-Gorham, 1956)
- The Promises of God (Dacre Press, 1958)
- They Met at Philippi (Oxford University Press, 1958)
- Is Death The End? A Christian Answer (Seabury Press, 1959)
- The Words of the Creeds (Forward Movement Publications, 1960)
- The First Gospel, Its Meaning and Message (Seabury Press, 1963)
- Living the Love of God (Morehouse-Barlow, 1965)
- Historical Road of Anglicanism (Regnery, 1968)
- Treasury of Quotations on Christian Themes (Seabury Press, 1975)
- Learning To Believe (Fortress Press, 1981)
- Does God Answer (Inter-Varsity Press, 1985)
- Prayer: The Divine Dialog (Inter-Varsity Press, 1985)
- Eternal You: An Exploration of a Spiritual Intuition (Crossroad, 1986) ISBN 9780824507459
