= Tex Sample =

American theologian, sociologist, and author

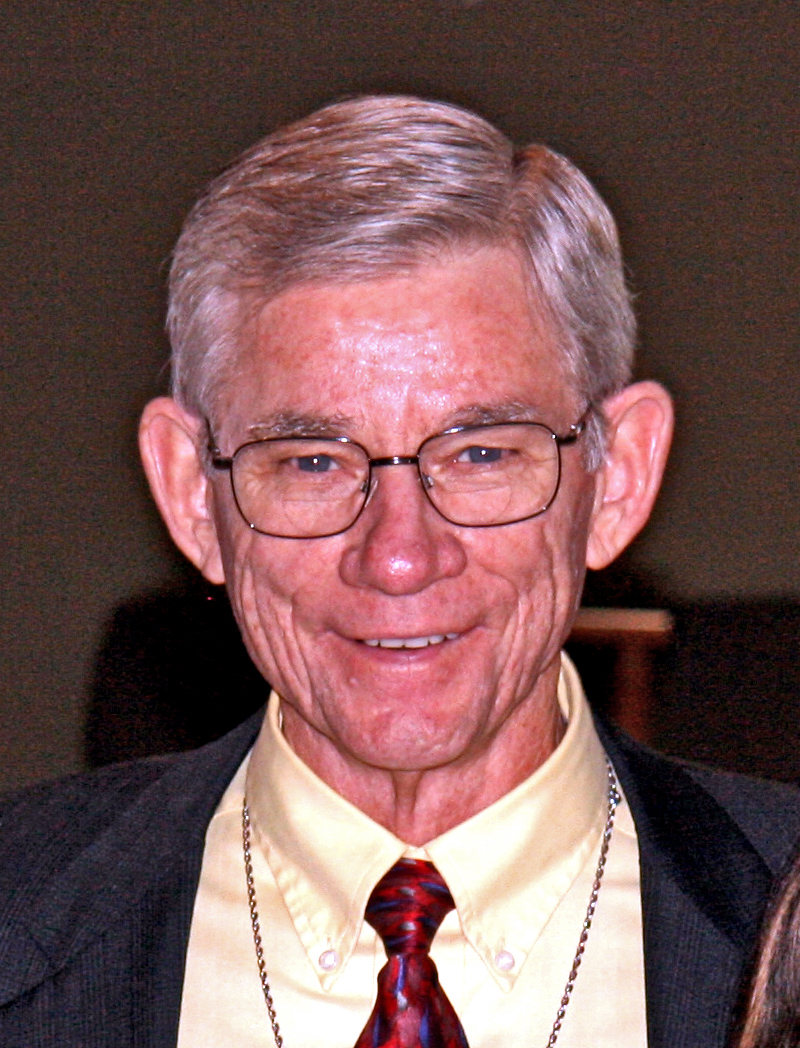
Tex Sample in October, 2008

Tex Sample (born December 28, 1934) is a specialist in church and society, a storyteller, author, and the Robert B. and Kathleen Rogers Professor Emeritus of Church and Society at the St. Paul School of Theology, a United Methodist seminary in Kansas City, Missouri, where he taught from 1967–1999. He has published four books about the working class.

== Background ==
Born in Brookhaven, Mississippi, Sample received a BA from Millsaps College, an M.Div. and Ph.D. from Boston University, and a DD from Coe College. A former cab driver, laborer, and oil field roustabout, As of 2015 he is a freelance speaker and consultant based in greater Kansas City, MO. A much sought-after lecturer, storyteller, workshop leader and consultant, Tex is a contributor to the DVD programs in the Living the Questions series. His most recent books are Earthy Mysticism (2008), The Future of John Wesley's Theology (2012), and Human Nature, Interest, and Power: a Critique of Reinhold Niebuhr's Social Thought (2013).

His father named him after Texanna Gillham, an African-American woman who was born in slavery and helped raise his father near Center, Texas.

== Books ==
- Blue Collar Ministry: Facing Economic and Social Realities of Working People, Judson Press, 1984, ISBN 0-8170-1029-7
- U.S. Lifestyles and Mainline Churches: A Key to Reaching People in the 90's, Westminster John Knox Press, 1990, ISBN 0-664-25099-8
- Hard Living People & Mainstream Christians, Abingdon Press, 1993, ISBN 0-687-17931-9
- Ministry in an Oral Culture-Living With Will Rogers, Uncle Remus, and Minnie Pearl, Westminster John Knox Press, 1994, ISBN 0-664-25506-X
- White Soul: Country Music, the Church, and Working Americans, Abingdon Press, 1996, ISBN 0-687-03293-8
- The Spectacle of Worship in a Wired World: Electronic Culture and the Gathered People of God, Abingdon Press, 1998, ISBN 0-687-08373-7
- The Loyal Opposition: Struggling With the Church on Homosexuality, Tex Sample and Amy E. Delong, editors, Abingdon Press, 2000, ISBN 0-687-08425-3
- Powerful Persuasion: Multimedia Witness in Christian Worship, Abingdon Press, 2005 ISBN 0-687-33901-4
- Blue Collar Resistance and the Politics of Jesus, Abingdon Press, 2006 ISBN 0-687-33502-7
- Earthy Mysticism: Spirituality for Unspiritual People, Abingdon Press, 2008 ISBN 0-687-64989-7
- The Future of John Wesley's Theology: Back to the Future with the Apostle Paul, Wipf and Stock Publishers, 2012 ISBN 978-1-61097-629-9
- Human Nature, Interest, and Power: a Critique of Reinhold Niebuhr's Social Thought, Wipf and Stock Publishers, 2013 ISBN 978-1-62032-626-8
