= Peter Morton Day =

American journalist

Peter Morton Day (August 1, 1914 – May 5, 1984) was a lay journalist and ecumenical leader in the Episcopal Church in the United States in the twentieth century. Born in East Chicago, Indiana, he was a graduate of Dartmouth College (cum laude 1935). He was editor of The Living Church weekly magazine, based in Milwaukee, from 1952 to 1964, having joined the magazine's staff in 1935. He was also president of the Wisconsin Federation of Settlements and Neighborhood Centers. He served as president of Associated Church Press in 1955 and 1956.

Day was appointed first national ecumenical officer of the Episcopal Church by Presiding Bishop Arthur C. Lichtenberger in 1964, serving on dialogue committees with Lutheran, Roman Catholic, and other Christian bodies in North America as well as with the Russian Orthodox Church. Day died in Milwaukee after a prolonged struggle with Alzheimer's Disease.

== Bibliography ==
- Saints on Main Street (Seabury Press, 1960)
- Strangers No Longer (Morehouse-Barlow, 1962)
- Tomorrow's Church: Catholic, Evangelical, Reformed (Seabury Press, 1969)
