= Associated Church Press =

Associated Church Press (a.k.a. "ACP", founded in 1916) is a professional membership organization for religious periodicals and press.

It organizes conferences, makes awards, organizes professional development opportunities, and provides postal advocacy and other resources for religious periodicals. Its Executive Director since 2017 is Gregg Brekke.

== History ==
The Associated Church Press traces its origin to a Saint Louis, Mo., meeting in 1916. Editors covering the quadrennial meeting of the Federal Council of Churches (now the National Council of Churches of Christ in the U.S.A.) decided that they should meet on a continuing basis.

Wartime constraints in 1917 and 1918 prevented meetings those two years. The second meeting was convened in Cleveland, Ohio, in June 1919. E. C. Wareing, Western Christian Advocate, was elected president of the then-named Editorial Council of the Religious Press. Jaspar T. Moses, National Bulletin, and F. M. Barton, The Expositor, were chosen secretary and treasurer, respectively.

In 1937, the name of the organization was changed to the Associated Church Press, and the constitution was revised. In 1947, a new constitution was adopted based on the recommendations of a special study committee headed by William B. Lipphard, Missions Magazine. Under the provisions of that constitution, membership in the Associated Church Press was extended to publications rather than to individual editors. However, provision for individual associate membership was made.

The Associated Church Press cooperates in educational and postal matters with religious press associations in the United States and Canada. It is also a corporate member of the World Association of Christian Communication, London, England.

== Awards ==
Each year the ACP presents awards in several areas, including National Reporting, Local Reporting, International Reporting, Science Reporting, Devotionals, Poetry and Humor.

The awards are presented during the ACP’s annual convention.

== Leadership ==
The ACP is governed by a board of directors. Its current board members are:

President: Celeste Kennel-Shank

Individual Member

Vice President: John Thomas III

The Christian Recorder

Past President: Stephen Chavez

Retired, Adventist Review / Adventist World

Treasurer: Kevin Shanley

Individual Member

OTHER DIRECTORS:

Jocelyn Bell

Broadview

Sally Hicks

Faith & Leadership, Duke University

Randy Hobson

PCUSA.org

Meagan Clark

Religion Unplugged / The Media Project

== See also ==
- Anglican Journal
- The Catholic Sun
- Peter Morton Day
- The Living Church
- Living Lutheran
- B. J. Stiles
- Touchstone (magazine)
