= Clifford Phelps Morehouse =

Clifford Phelps Morehouse (April 18, 1904 – February 17, 1977) was a prominent lay Episcopalian journalist and publisher.

In 1932, Morehouse succeeded his father, Frederic Cook Morehouse, as editor of The Living Church magazine founded by his grandfather Linden Morehouse. Clifford Morehouse was a member of the Executive Council of the Episcopal Church, and served as President of the House of Deputies of the General Convention from 1961 to 1967.

== See also ==
- Linden H. Morehouse

== Bibliography ==
- The Anglican Communion throughout the World: A Series of Missionary Papers from the Field (1927)
- A Layman Looks at the Church (1964)
- The Church of Tomorrow (1969)
- Trinity: Mother of Churches (1973)
