= Charles Wesley Leffingwell =

American author, educator, and Episcopal priest

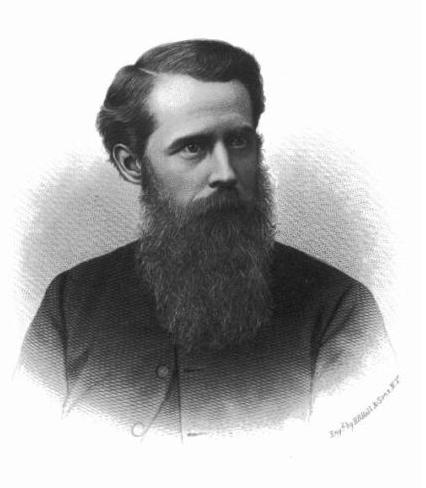
Charles Wesley Leffingwell

Charles Wesley Leffingwell (December 5, 1840 – October 10, 1928) was an American author, educator, and Episcopal priest.

== Biography ==
Charles Wesley Leffingwell was born in Ellington, Connecticut. He was a descendant of Thomas Leffingwell, known as one of the founders of Norwich, Connecticut. He studied at Union College in Schenectady, New York, and Knox College in Galesburg, Illinois, where he was a member of Beta Theta Pi. He later studied at Nashotah House Theological Seminary before ordination to the diaconate (1867) and priesthood (1868). In 1868, he founded St. Mary's School in Knoxville, Illinois at the invitation of Henry John Whitehouse, and in 1890, he founded St Alban's School for Boys in the same city.

Leffingwell was editor of The Living Church magazine from 1880 to 1900.

From 1906, he was President of the Leffingwell Rancho in Whittier, California, the land for which he had acquired earlier. His son Charles Warring Leffingwell (sometimes written as Charles W. Leffingwell Jr.) was responsible for the active management of the ranch, which produced fruits and nuts (lemons and walnuts).

His other son, Ernest de Koven Leffingwell was an arctic explorer and geologist. Leffingwell provided partial financial support for his son's explorations.

Leffingwell moved to Pasadena, California (of which Herringshaw's lists him as a founder) in 1908. He died there on October 10, 1928.

Leffingwell Road, which goes through South Whittier, East Whittier, and Whittier, was named after him. Another small segment of Leffingwell goes through the city of Norwalk.

== Published works ==
- Reading Book of English Classics for Young Pupils (New York: Putnam, 1888)
- Lyrics of The Living Church (Chicago: A. C. McClurg and Company, 1891)
- The Laughing and Sorrowful Rain, and Other Poems (Privately printed, 1899)
- A Book of Prayers, together with Psalms and Hymns and Spiritual Songs, Ancient and Modern (Milwaukee: 1922)
- Early Days at St. Mary’s, Knoxville, Illinois (Milwaukee: Morehouse Publishing, 1926)
- The Leffingwell Record: A genealogy of the descendants of Lieut. Thomas Leffingwell Pequot Press, Chester, Connecticut 1897
