= Keenan Land =

Keenan Land was the name given to a mass of land in the Beaufort Sea about 300 miles north of Point Barrow, Alaska. It was allegedly discovered in the 1870s by American whaler John Keenan (1834/35, Watervliet, New York – March 11, 1910, Troy, New York).

John Keenan reported stranding his ship on an uncharted island, where he raised the American flag. After his return, the island was named after him.

Starting in 1907 with the Anglo-American Polar Expedition, numerous unsuccessful attempts were made (by Vilhjalmur Stefansson and Roald Amundsen, among others) to relocate Keenan Land. Hubert Wilkins flew over the area in 1937 on his search for the missing Sigizmund Levanevsky and came to the conclusion that the land never existed.

== See also ==
- 1906 German map showing Keenan Land north of Alaska
- Bradley Land
- Crocker Land
- Sannikov Land
