= The Living Church =

American monthly magazine

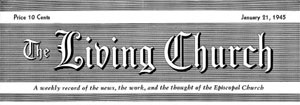

- Editor: Mark Michael
- Categories: Religious magazine
- Frequency: Monthly
- Publisher: Matthew S. C. Olver
- Founder: Samuel Smith Haris
- Founded: 1878
- Company: The Living Church Foundation
- Country: United States
- Based in: Milwaukee, Wisconsin
- Language: English
- Website: livingchurch.org
- ISSN: 0024-5240

The Living Church is an American magazine based in Milwaukee, Wisconsin, providing commentary and news on the Episcopal Church and the wider Anglican Communion. It is the flagship publication of The Living Church Foundation. In continuous publication since 1878, it has generally been identified with the Anglo-Catholic wing of Anglicanism and has been cited by national newspapers as representing that tradition. It absorbed a number of earlier Anglo-Catholic publications, including The American Churchman, Catholic Champion (1901), and The Angelus (1904). Theologically and culturally, it tends to have a moderate-to-conservative slant.

On June 21, 1931, the last issues of associated periodicals, The Young Churchman and The Shepherd's Arms were published.

The executive director and publisher of the Living Church Foundation is Matthew S. C. Olver and the editor-in-chief of The Living Church magazine is Mark Michael. The periodical is a member of the Associated Church Press, a religious periodical group. Some of the magazine's content has been made available online since the late 20th century.

== Editors and executive directors ==
- Samuel Smith Harris (1878–1879)
- John Fulton (1878–1879)
- Charles Wesley Leffingwell (1879–1900)
- Frederic Cook Morehouse (1900–1932)
- Clifford Phelps Morehouse (1932–1952)
- Peter Morton Day (1952–1964)
- Carroll Eugene Simcox (January 1964 – 1977)
- H. Boone Porter (1977–1990)
- David Kalvelage (1990–2009)
- Christopher Wells (editor, 2009–2019; executive director, 2019-2022)
- Mark Michael (editor, 2019–present)
- Matthew S. C. Olver (executive director and publisher; 2023–present)

== See also ==
- The Anglican Digest
- The Anglican Way
- Church Times
- Linden H. Morehouse
