= John Shelby Spong =

American Episcopal bishop (1931–2021)

The Right Reverend John Shelby Spong
- Bishop Emeritus of Newark
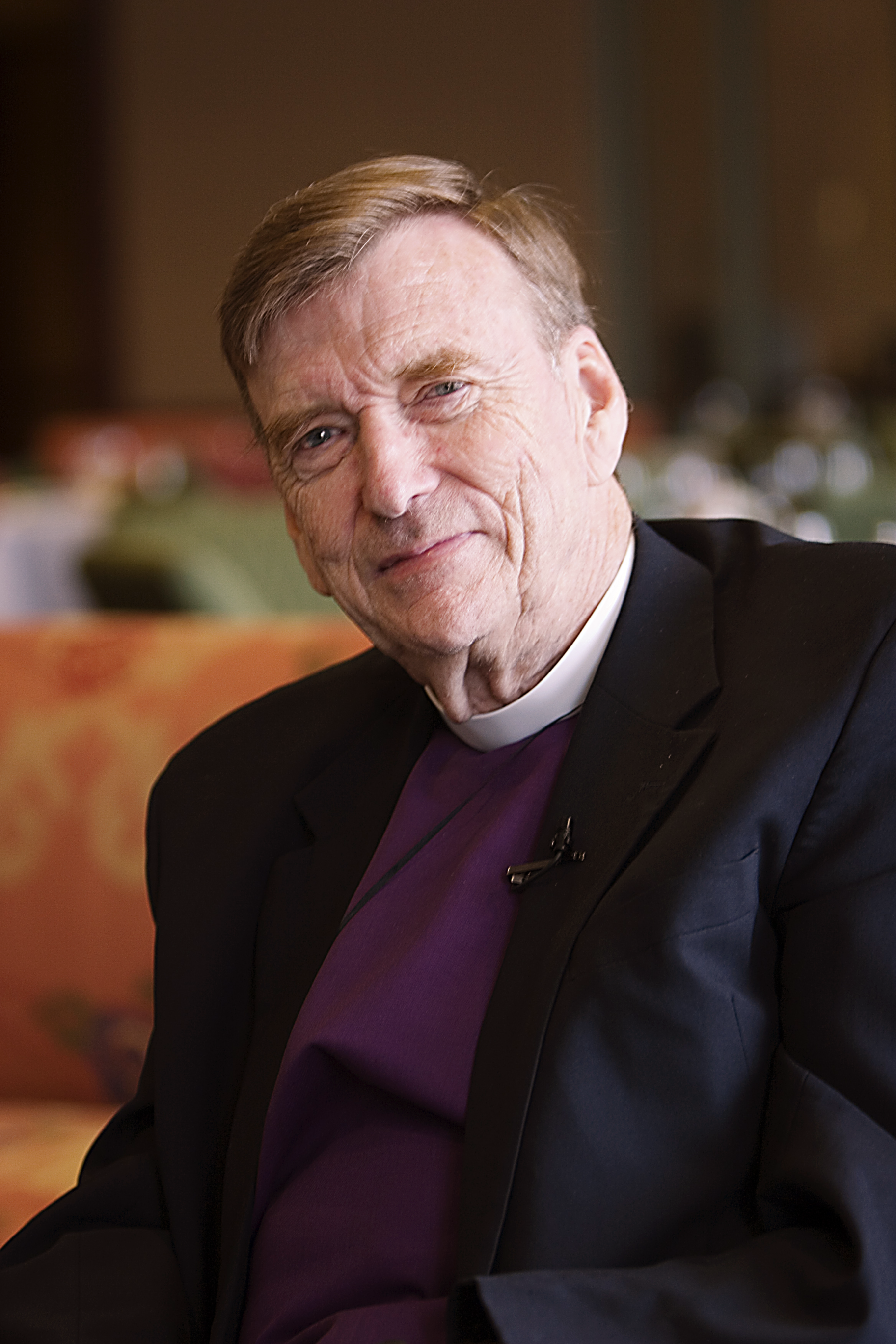
- Spong in 2006
- Church: Episcopal Church
- Province: Province 2
- Diocese: Newark
- In office: 1979–2000
- Predecessor: George Rath
- Successor: John P. Croneberger
- Previous post: Coadjutor Bishop of Newark (1976–1979)

Orders
- Ordination: December 1955 by Edwin A. Penick
- Consecration: June 12, 1976 by John Allin

Personal details
- Born: June 16, 1931 Charlotte, North Carolina, US
- Died: September 12, 2021 (aged 90) Richmond, Virginia, US
- Parents: John Shelby Spong, Doolie Boyce Griffith
- Spouse: Joan Lydia Ketner (m. 1952, d. 1988); Christine Mary Bridger (m. 1990)
- Children: 5
- Education: University of North Carolina; Virginia Theological Seminary

Religious life
- Religion: Christianity (Mainline Protestantism)
- Denomination: Anglicanism (of the U.S. Episcopal Church)
- Church: St. Joseph's Episcopal Church of Durham, NC (rector, 1955–1957); Calvary Episcopal Church of Tarboro, NC (rector, 1957–1965); St. John's Episcopal Church of Lynchburg, VA (rector, 1965–1969); St. Paul's Episcopal Church of Richmond, VA (rector, 1969–1976); Diocese of Newark, NJ (bishop, 1979–2000)
- Profession: Episcopalian bishop

John Shelby "Jack" Spong (June 16, 1931 – September 12, 2021) was an American Mainline Protestant bishop of the Episcopal Church. Born in Charlotte, North Carolina, he served as the Bishop of Newark, New Jersey, from 1979 to 2000. Spong was a liberal Christian theologian and author who called for a fundamental rethinking of Christian belief away from theism and traditional doctrines.

He held progressive and controversial views on Christianity, including rejection of traditional Christian doctrines, his advocacy for LGBTQ rights, and his support for interfaith dialogue. Spong was a contributor to the Living the Questions DVD program and was a guest on numerous national television broadcasts. Spong died on September 12, 2021, at his home in Richmond, Virginia, at the age of 90.

== Early life ==
John Shelby Spong was born on June 16, 1931, in Charlotte, North Carolina. He grew up attending fundamentalist churches and was heavily influenced by his mother's religious beliefs. After his father died when he was 12 years old, Spong began to attend an Episcopal church, finding a mentor in its rector Robert Crandall, and leading him to reinterpret and become more deeply involved in his faith.

He attended public schools in Charlotte and later went on to study at the University of North Carolina at Chapel Hill, where he graduated with a Bachelor of Arts degree in 1952 as a Phi Beta Kappa graduate. He received his Master of Divinity degree from the Virginia Theological Seminary in 1955.

== Career ==
Spong was ordained to the Episcopal priesthood in 1955. He served as rector of St. Joseph's Church in Durham, North Carolina, from 1955 to 1957; rector of Calvary Parish, Tarboro, North Carolina, from 1957 to 1965; rector of St. John's Church in Lynchburg, Virginia, from 1965 to 1969; and rector of St. Paul's Church in Richmond, Virginia, from 1969 to 1976. Spong became bishop coadjutor of Newark in 1976.

Spong was the bishop of the Episcopal Diocese of Newark from 1979 to 2000. He was a leader of the church's liberal wing. He was one of the first American bishops to ordain a woman into the clergy (in 1977), and he was the first to ordain an openly gay man (Robert Williams in 1989). In response to the Williams ordination, Spong was censured by the church's House of Bishops in 1990. Later the church followed his lead; an Episcopal court ruled that homosexuality was not counter to its principles in 1996, and the church recognized same-sex marriages in 2015. Spong held visiting positions and gave lectures at major American theological institutions, most prominently at Harvard Divinity School. He retired in 2000. As a retired bishop, he was a member of the Episcopal Church's House of Bishops.

During a speaking tour in Australia in 2001, Spong was banned by Peter Hollingworth, the Archbishop of Brisbane, from speaking at churches in the diocese. The tour coincided with Hollingworth leaving the diocese to become the Governor-General of Australia. Hollingworth said that it was not an appropriate moment for Spong to "engage congregations in matters that could prove theologically controversial". After Spong's book Jesus for the Non-Religious was published in 2007, Peter Jensen, the Archbishop of Sydney, banned Spong from preaching at any churches in his diocese. By contrast, Phillip Aspinall, the Primate of Australia, invited Spong in 2007 to deliver two sermons at St John's Cathedral, Brisbane.

Spong described his own life as a journey from the literalism and conservative theology of his childhood to an expansive view of Christianity. In a 2013 interview, Spong credited the Anglican bishop John Robinson as his mentor in this journey and said reading Robinson's writings in the 1960s led to a friendship and mentoring relationship with him over many years.

A recipient of many awards, Spong was a contributor to the Living the Questions DVD program and was a guest on numerous national television broadcasts (including The Today Show, Politically Incorrect with Bill Maher, Dateline, 60 Minutes, and Larry King Live).

Spong received honorary Doctor of Divinity degrees from Virginia Theological Seminary and Saint Paul's College, Virginia, as well as an honorary Doctor of Humane Letters from Muhlenberg College. He was awarded the Humanist of the Year award in 1993 and the Religious Liberty Award in 2016 by the American Humanist Association.

=== Beliefs ===
Spong's views on the Bible, God, and Jesus Christ challenged traditional Christian beliefs.

Spong stated that he was a Christian because he believed that Jesus Christ fully expressed the presence of a God of compassion and selfless love and that this is the meaning of the early Christian proclamation, "Jesus is Lord." Elaborating on this last idea, he affirmed that Jesus was adopted by God as his son, and he says that this would be the way God was fully incarnated in Jesus Christ. He rejected the historical truth claims of some Christian doctrines, such as the virgin birth and the bodily resurrection of Jesus. In 2000, Spong was a critic of the Congregation for the Doctrine of the Faith of the Roman Catholic Church's declaration Dominus Iesus, because it reaffirmed the Catholic doctrine that the Roman Catholic Church is the one true Church and that Jesus Christ is the one and only savior for humanity.

Spong was a proponent of the church reflecting the changes in society at large. Towards these ends, he called for a new Reformation, in which many of Christianity's basic doctrines should be reformulated. In 1998, Rowan Williams, the Bishop of Monmouth who later became Archbishop of Canterbury, described Spong's Twelve Points for Reform as embodying "confusion and misinterpretation".

Avatar of John Shelby Spong

John Shelby Spong
(@JohnShelbySpong)
tweeted:

God is not a noun, that demands to be defined, God is a verb that invites us to live, to love and to be.

April 20, 2015

Spong debated Christian philosopher and apologist William Lane Craig on the historicity of the resurrection of Jesus on March 20, 2005.

==== Views on inclusion of women and LGBT people ====
Spong advocated for expanding the role of women in the church. He was one of the first American bishops to ordain a woman into the clergy, in 1977, and he continued to support women's ordination throughout his career. Spong argued that the church needed to be more inclusive and accepting of diversity, including gender diversity.

Spong also supported LGBTQ inclusion. He was the first American bishop to ordain an openly gay man, Robert Williams, in 1989. Spong argued that the church needed to be more accepting of LGBTQ people and that traditional Christian beliefs about sexuality needed to be reinterpreted in light of modern knowledge and understanding.

=== Writings ===
Spong's writings relied on Biblical and non-Biblical sources and were influenced by modern critical analysis of these sources. He believed in a nuanced approach to scripture, informed by scholarship and compassion, which he argued can be consistent with both Christian tradition and a contemporary understanding of the universe. Spong's writings display a stream of thought considered congruent with Peter Abelard and the existentialism of Paul Tillich, whom he called his favorite theologian.

Spong's books include A New Christianity for a New World, Rescuing the Bible from Fundamentalism, and Why Christianity Must Change or Die. In A New Christianity for a New World, Spong argued for a fundamental rethinking of Christian belief away from Theism and outlined his ideas for doctrinal changes within Christianity in the modern world. In Rescuing the Bible from Fundamentalism, Spong challenged the literal interpretation of the Bible and argued for a more nuanced approach to scripture; he also argued that St. Paul was homosexual, a theme that was satirized in Gore Vidal's novel Live from Golgotha. In Why Christianity Must Change or Die, Spong contended that Christianity must adapt to the changing world or risk becoming irrelevant. The theological scholar Antony Alumkal has called Spong's writings on Jesus a "replica of the Jesus embraced by Unitarians in the late 19th and early 20th centuries."

Spong's influence on the theological debate can be seen in the work of other theologians, such as Marcus Borg, John Dominic Crossan, and Karen Armstrong, who also challenged traditional Christian beliefs and called for a more inclusive and progressive faith.

== Personal life and death ==
In 1955, Spong married Joan Lydia Ketner. She died in 1988. In 1990, Spong married Christine Mary Bridger. Spong had five children.

Spong died on September 12, 2021, at the age of 90.

== Publications ==
- 1973 – Honest Prayer, ISBN 1-878282-18-2
- 1974 – This Hebrew Lord, ISBN 0-06-067520-9
- 1975 – Christpower, ISBN 1-878282-11-5
- 1975 – Dialogue: In Search of Jewish-Christian Understanding (co-authored with Rabbi Jack Daniel Spiro), ISBN 1-878282-16-6
- 1976 – Life Approaches Death: A Dialogue on Ethics in Medicine
- 1977 – The Living Commandments, ISBN 1-878282-17-4
- 1980 – The Easter Moment, ISBN 1-878282-15-8
- 1983 – Into the Whirlwind: The Future of the Church, ISBN 1-878282-13-1
- 1986 – Beyond Moralism: A Contemporary View of the Ten Commandments (co-authored with Denise G. Haines, Archdeacon), ISBN 1-878282-14-X
- 1987 – Consciousness and Survival: An Interdisciplinary Inquiry into the Possibility of Life Beyond Biological Death (edited by John S. Spong, introduction by Claiborne Pell), ISBN 0-943951-00-3
- 1987 A Plea for Inclusive Catholicity
- 1988 – Living in Sin? A Bishop Rethinks Human Sexuality, ISBN 0-06-067507-1
- 1991 – Rescuing the Bible from Fundamentalism: A Bishop Rethinks the Meaning of Scripture, ISBN 0-06-067518-7
- 1992 – Born of a Woman: A Bishop Rethinks the Birth of Jesus, ISBN 0-06-067523-3
- 1994 – Resurrection: Myth or Reality? A Bishop's Search for the Origins of Christianity, ISBN 0-06-067546-2
- 1996 – Liberating the Gospels: Reading the Bible with Jewish Eyes, ISBN 0-06-067557-8
- 1999 – Why Christianity Must Change or Die: A Bishop Speaks to Believers In Exile, ISBN 0-06-067536-5
- 2001 – Here I Stand: My Struggle for a Christianity of Integrity, Love and Equality, ISBN 0-06-067539-X
- 2002 – God in Us: A Case for Christian Humanism (with Anthony Freeman), ISBN 978-0907845171
- 2002 – A New Christianity for a New World: Why Traditional Faith Is Dying and How a New Faith Is Being Born, ISBN 0-06-067063-0
- 2005 – The Sins of Scripture: Exposing the Bible's Texts of Hate to Reveal the God of Love, ISBN 0-06-076205-5
- 2007 – Jesus for the Non-Religious, ISBN 0-06-076207-1
- 2009 – Eternal Life: A New Vision: Beyond Religion, Beyond Theism, Beyond Heaven and Hell, ISBN 0-06-076206-3
- 2011 – Re-claiming the Bible for a Non-Religious World, ISBN 978-0-06-201128-2
- 2013 – The Fourth Gospel: Tales of a Jewish Mystic, ISBN 978-0-06-201130-5
- 2016 – Biblical Literalism: A Gentile Heresy, ISBN 978-0-06-236230-8
- 2018 – Unbelievable: Why Neither Ancient Creeds Nor the Reformation Can Produce a Living Faith Today, ISBN 0-06-264129-8
