= Integrity USA =

American nonprofit organization

Integrity USA was a nonprofit organization affiliated with the Episcopal Church in the United States. It was founded in 1974 to promote the inclusion of LGBTQ members and their allies for equal access to Episcopal rites, but dissolved in April 2022 following financial misconduct allegations concerning its board of directors.

== History ==
=== Founding ===
Integrity was founded in 1974 by Louie Crew in rural Georgia, US.

Crew, who was on a teaching fellowship in San Francisco, California, telephoned the reportedly progressive Grace Episcopal Cathedral, asking if they could help him and his partner meet other gay Episcopalians. The derisive laughter he heard in response prompted him to start a newsletter to help LGBTQ members of the Episcopal Church support each other in a hostile ecclesiastical environment.

Crew wrote in the lead editorial:

Integrity derives from integer, Latin for 'entire.' All Christian wholeness demands affirmation of God ordained sexuality; and gays and straights alike are Charged with the responsibility of using their sexuality in healthy human sharing rather than perversely trying to change or exchange the Gift of God.

Often working in coalition with both secular and other faith-based groups, Integrity worked for equal protection and opportunity for LGBTQ Episcopalians.

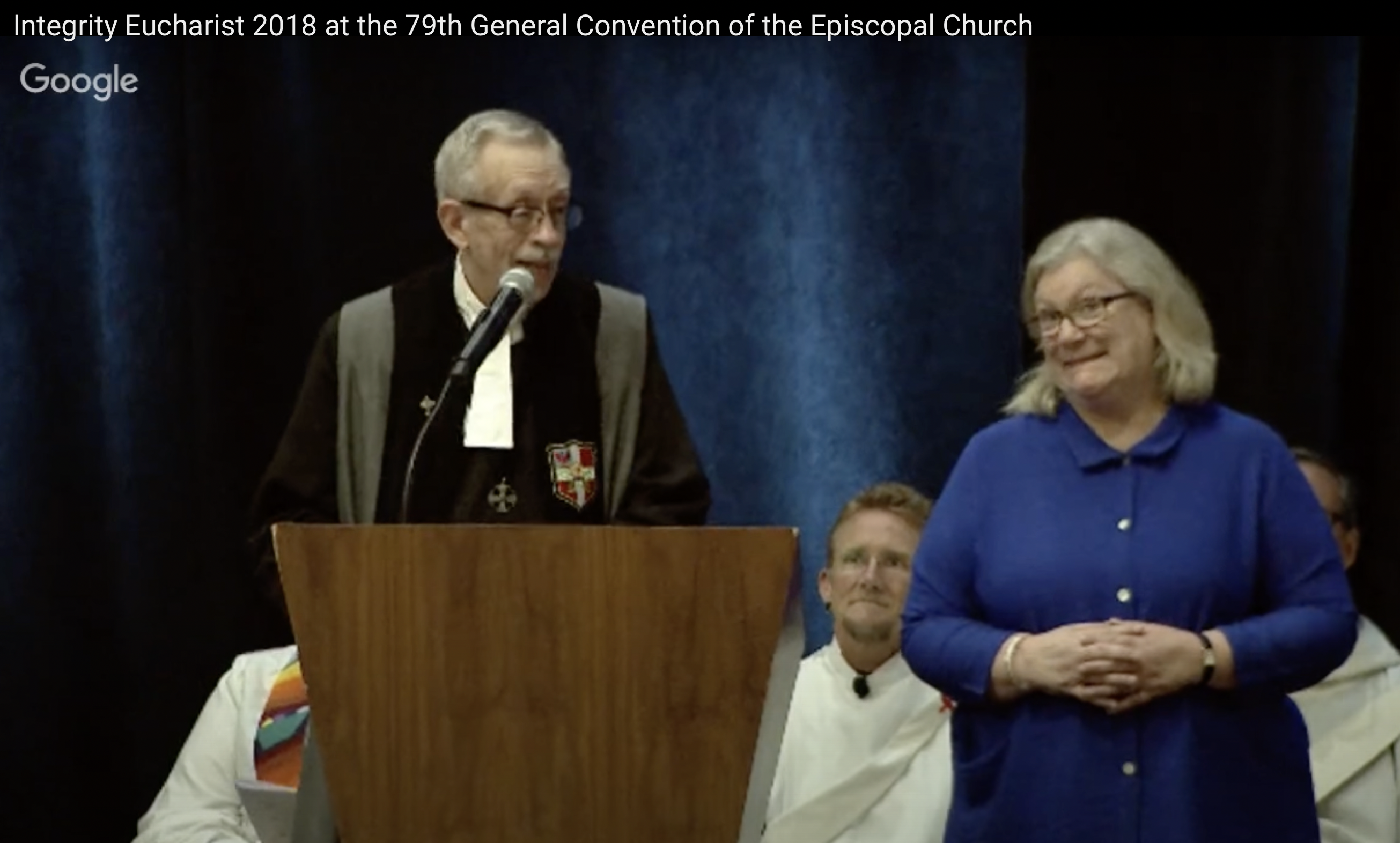
Integrity USA awards a trophy to the President of the House of Deputies at the 79th General Convention of the Episcopal Church in Austin, Texas. July 8, 2018.

Integrity sponsored the Integrity Eucharist at the General Convention of the Episcopal Church, which was one of the most well-attended related events to take place during each General Convention.

In 2010, the group lobbied the US Congress in support of the Employment Non-Discrimination Act (ENDA), and in 2021 declared its support for the Equality Act.

=== Financial mismanagement allegations ===
A 2019 report by Egan Millard of the Episcopal News Service described the President's leadership as marked by "instability and uncertainty," and reported Integrity had $516,152 in net assets at the start of 2013, and was taking in over $200,000 per year for the preceding several years. By 2015, the last year it filed a full tax return to the US Internal Revenue Service, the group' reported net assets were reported to be $134,029.

The Illinois Secretary of State dissolved Integrity USA's incorporation status in 2019, which Integrity's president said was due to the board's failure to file the nonprofit's annual financial report. Once the report was filed, the group was reinstated.

Between March 2019 and June 2019, three Integrity USA board members resigned, leaving only one elected board member, and by October 2019, Integrity USA was described by Millard as "a shadow of its former self, beset by struggles with leadership, finances, and communication," and the board's term was reported to be defined by "instability and uncertainty." In June 2019, Integrity announced via Twitter that two employees of the Episcopal Diocese of East Carolina had been appointed to the board, and Integrity USA's address changed to Kinston, North Carolina, the seat of the Episcopal Diocese of East Carolina.

In December 2019, amid allegations of mismanagement, Integrity USA's president resigned, citing the need to spend more time with her family.

Integrity USA Founder Louie Crew Clay died two days later, on November 27, 2019.

=== Final board election ===
In early 2020, Egan Millard of Episcopal News Service reported that Integrity USA's board election was "plagued by controversy." Integrity USA's board declined to name who would be voting in an election for the nonprofit's next president, and "did not include an opportunity to write in an alternative candidate, which is mandated by Integrity's bylaws – an omission that further frustrated some members."

According to Millard, Integrity USA's Secretary Ellis Montes nominated Ron Ward, who had no prior history of involvement with Integrity, as candidate for president of the group. Integrity members raised concerns about Ward's lack of experience with Integrity and The Episcopal Church, as well as an incident in 2012 when he was kicked off the Norwich Democratic Town Committee for "a pattern of behavior that included personal attacks and a history of absences from monthly committee meetings". No votes were cast for the candidate running for President of Integrity USA. Instead, multiple former Integrity USA presidents publicly called for the nonprofit's dissolution. At the March 17, 2020 board meeting, the chair of the stakeholders' council of the board of Integrity asserted that he did not recognize Ward as its president.

As further appointments to the organization's board were made in what some members felt were in contravention of the nonprofit corporation's by-laws, the legitimacy of Integrity USA's leadership and future elections were placed in doubt by some remaining membership.

In April 2022, the group was formally dissolved.

== See also ==
- Anglican views of homosexuality
- Blessing of same-sex unions in Christian churches
- Christianity and sexual orientation
- Homosexuality and Christianity
- Lesbian and Gay Christian Movement
- LGBT clergy in Christianity
- Religion and homosexuality
