= George C. Van Tuyl Jr. =

American banker (1872–1938)

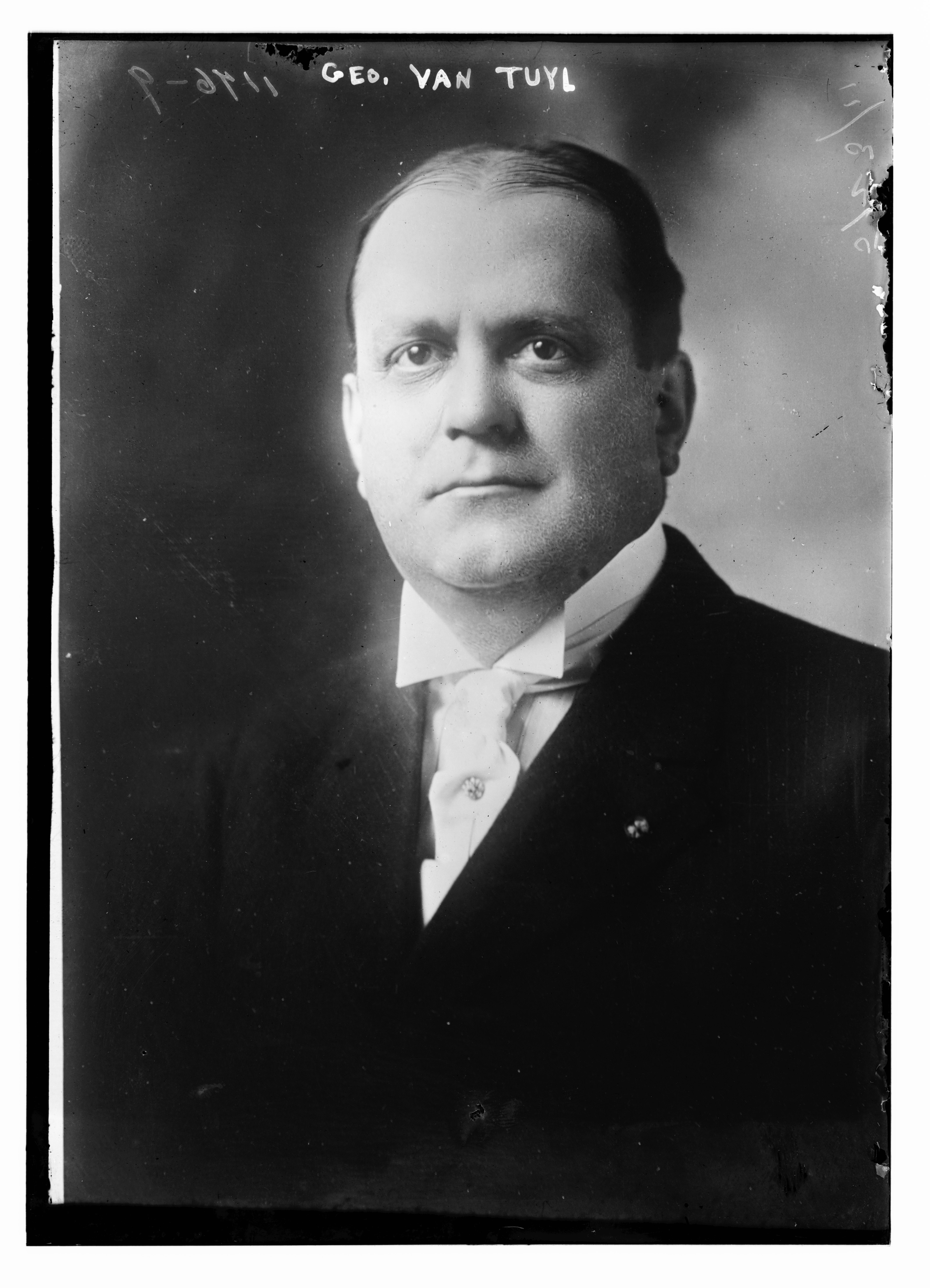

President of the Metropolitan Trust Company
- In office 1914–1920
- Preceded by: Brayton Ives
- Succeeded by: Harold I. Pratt

New York State Superintendent of Banks
- In office 1911–1914
- Preceded by: Orion H. Cheney
- Succeeded by: Eugene Lamb Richards

Personal details
- Born: George Casey Van Tuyl Jr. April 3, 1872 Albany, New York, US
- Died: February 9, 1938 (aged 65) New York City, US
- Party: Republican
- Spouses: Georgina Birch (m. 1903; died 1906) Lela E. LaMoure (m. 1920)

George Casey Van Tuyl, Jr. (April 3, 1872 – February 9, 1938) was an American banker from New York.

== Early life ==
Van Tuyl was born on April 3, 1872, in Albany, New York, the son of hardware businessman George Casey Van Tuyl and Angeline Elizabeth Hawley. He was a member of the Van Tuyl family, a Dutch family originally from Tiel.

== Career ==
Van Tuyl began working as a messenger for the National Exchange Bank in Albany in 1888. He spent the next six years advancing through different departments in the bank and became a bank teller in 1894. When the Albany Trust Company was formed in 1900, he accepted a position as its secretary and treasurer. In 1906, he became its vice-president. In 1908, he was elected its president. He was also president and a director of the First National Bank of Albany, a trustee of the Albany Exchange Savings Bank, and a director of the First National Bank of Ravena, the Niagara Falls Trust Company of Niagara Falls, and the Mutual Fire Insurance Company of Albany. He resigned from all his bank positions in 1911, when he became Bank Superintendent.

In 1911, Governor Dix nominated Van Tuyl State Superintendent of Banks. Van Tuyl was a Republican, but a close friend of the governor. Tammany Hall initially opposed the nomination, but he was confirmed to the position. As Bank Superintendent, he developed the Van Tuyl Commission, which revised the state's banking laws.

Van Tuyl served in as Bank Superintendent until 1914. He then moved to New York City, residing on Riverside Drive and working for a number of banking institutions in the city. He worked as president of the Metropolitan Trust Company, a director and executive committee member of the Bank of United States, and a director of the Mechanics Bank of Brooklyn, the Mutual Fire Insurance Company, the Albany Trust Company, and the Guarantee Securities Company. In 1928, he became president of the Bankers Loan and Investment Company. He was also director of the Utica Trust and Deposit Company, the Central Savings Bank of New York City, the Atlantic Mutual Insurance Company of New York City, the Alabama, Tennessee, and Northern Railroad, the City Safe and Deposit Company of New York, Cartier in New York City, and the United Hotels Corporation of New York.

== Personal life ==
On October 14, 1903, he married Georgina Birch, a daughter of George Archibald Birch and Sarah Ann (née Cook) Birch, in Albany. She died in Albany during childbirth on May 17, 1906.

In 1920, he married Lela E. (née LaMoure) Gladwell at the Church of the Heavenly Rest in Manhattan. Lela, the widow of Lewis Gladwell, was a daughter of Dr. Isaac W. LaMoure and Emma (née Grant), who married Charles Edward Starr after her father's death in 1873. From her mother's second marriage, she had a younger half-sister, actress Frances Starr, who married artist William Haskell Coffin, banker R. Golden Donaldson, and attorney Emil C. Wetten.

Van Tuyl belonged to the Episcopal Church and was a member of the Metropolitan Club, the New York Yacht Club, and the New York Athletic Club.

Van Tuyl died at 194 Riverside Drive, his home in Manhattan, on February 9, 1938. He was buried in the Albany Rural Cemetery.
