= Mariette Leslie Cotton =

American painter

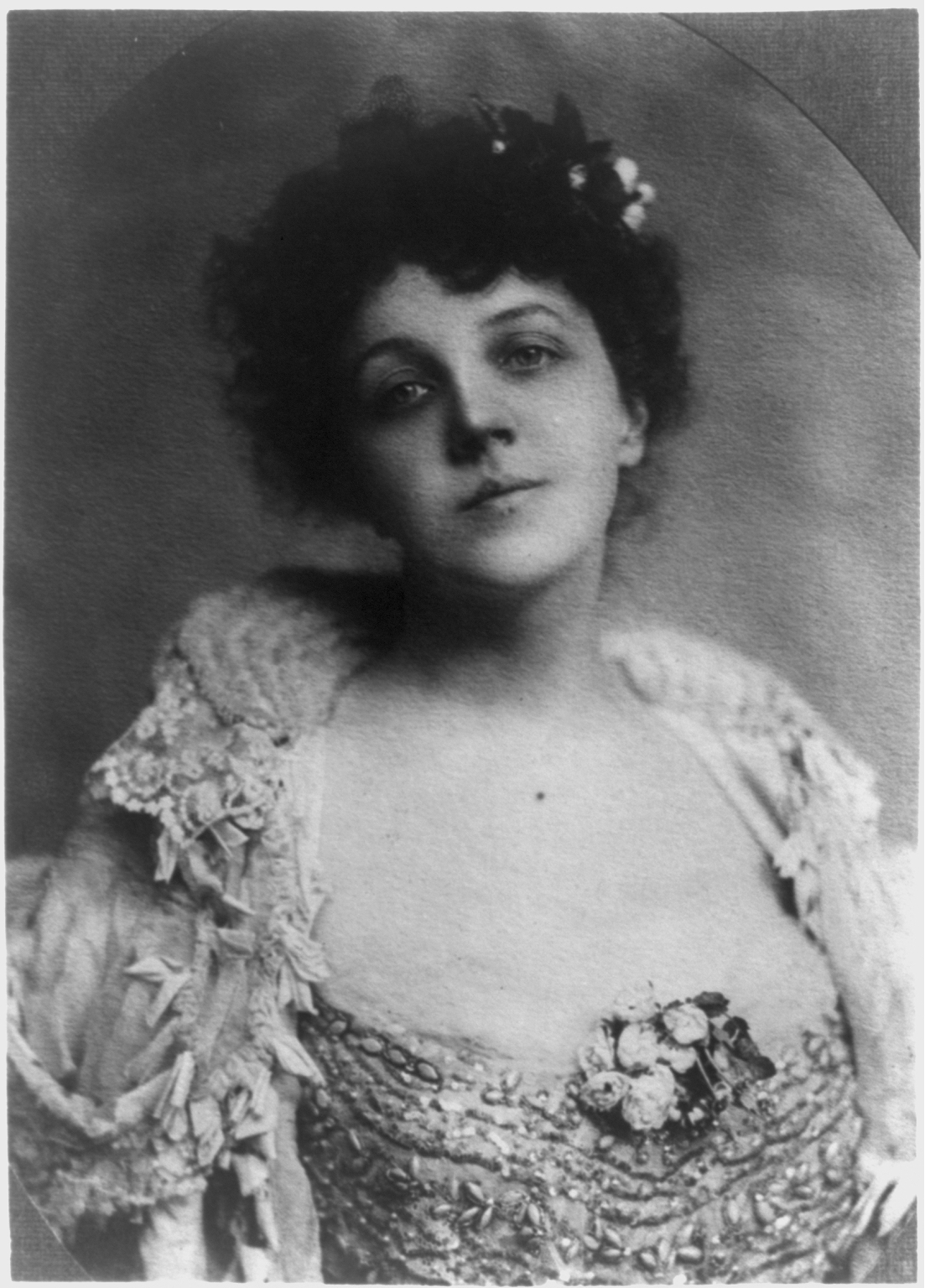
- Cotton, circa 1900
- Born: Mariette Benedict; May 17, 1866; Schenectady, New York
- Died: April 21, 1947 (aged 80)
- Known for: Artist
- Spouse: Joseph Leslie Cotton

Mariette Leslie Cotton (1866–1947) was an American artist who usually gave her name as Mrs. Leslie Cotton. A student of William Merritt Chase, Carolus-Duran, and Jean-Jacques Henner, she worked mainly in Paris but also maintained studios in London and New York. By birth and marriage she possessed a level of wealth and social prestige that, together with her artistic skill, enabled her to obtain lucrative commissions from prominent individuals. The portraits she painted were praised for their veracity, style, and fine technique. Their subjects included kings, aristocrats, celebrities, and members of wealthy families. Late in her career a critic wrote that her "popularity has a sound basis, for her portraits combine such abstract artistic qualities as effective and infinitely varied design and daringly unconventional arrangements of color, with strong characterization and a likeness that never fails to be convincing," and added, "her concern with the artistic problem never makes her obtrude her own personality or offend the sitter's susceptibilities."

== Early life ==
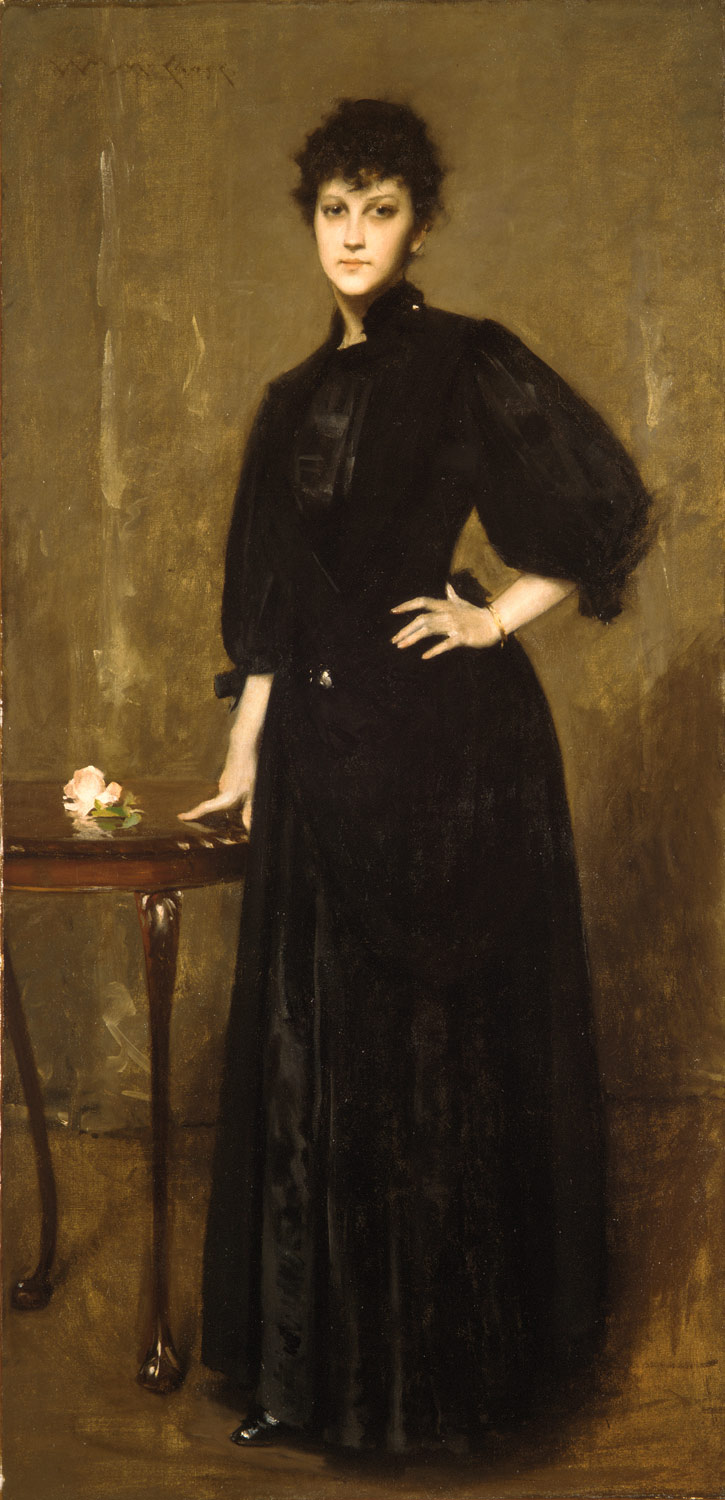
"Lady in Black" (Portrait of Mariette Leslie Cotton at age nineteen) by William Merritt Chase (1888, oil on canvas, 74 1/4 x 36 5/16 inches)

Cotton was born on May 17, 1866, in Schenectady, New York. Her birth name was Mariette Benedict and until she was twenty she was generally known as "Pansy Benedict".

Her early training appears to have come from her mother, a woman who was considered to be talented both as artist and singer and she may also have received informal training from an art instructor at the college where her parents had their home. (Note: The art instructor was William Appleton Potter, a relative of Cotton's who taught at Union College during her childhood. Her father, Samuel Tweedy Benedict, also taught at the college and the family lived on campus.) However she came by it, Cotton's talent was such that she was considered to be an accomplished amateur artist before she was twenty.

In 1888, newly married and having moved to Manhattan from her parents' home, Cotton sought to become a student of William Merritt Chase. He agreed to teach her and at the same time asked whether she would sit for a portrait. In 1908 Chase described the meeting: "One morning a young lady came into my Tenth street studio, just as I was leaving for an art class in Brooklyn. She came as a pupil, but the moment she appeared before me I saw her only as a splendid model. Half way to the elevated station I stopped, hastened back, and overtook her. She consented to sit for me; and I painted that day, without an interruption, till late in the evening. The result is the Lady in Black, now hung in the Metropolitan Museum." (Note: Painted in 1888, "Lady in Black" was well known and highly regarded during Chase's lifetime and remains so today. In 1891 he donated it to the Metropolitan Museum of Art which still displays it.)

In 1889, a second Chase portrait of her, "Lady in Pink", was shown at the Spring Exhibition at the National Academy of Design in New York. (Note: "Lady in Pink" appeared as the first illustration in the catalog of the Academy exhibition and received a favorable review in the issue of Art Amateur for May 1889. Purchased from him in 1893, it was donated to the museum of the Rhode Island School of Design as the first of the museum's possessions.)

== Career ==
In the early months of that year Cotton and her husband sailed for Europe. In leaving his position in a New York firm of importers, he indicated that the couple intended to live abroad permanently. Not long after their arrival Cotton began study in a Parisian studio run by the portraitists, Carolus-Duran and Jean-Jacques Henner, who were known for taking on women students, particularly Anglo-Americans. (Note: In 1874 Carlos-Duran and Henner had founded what the latter called "l'Atelier des Dames," a studio reserved for teaching aspiring women artists. Both were known for their rejection of the academic realism then popular in portraiture in favor of a freer style. They were also known for the influence of Diego Velázquez on their work.)

=== Early portrait work ===
1891

A remarkable debut in London is made by a young American artist of great promise, Mrs. Mariette Cotton, who has evidently acquired from her master, M. Carolus-Duran, many of the secrets of his powerful palette, and with them his felicity in the simple and direct presentation of a subject. ... Her standpoint is as yet very naturally ultra-French; and, after the fashion of many of her most accomplished fellow countrymen, she too strongly tinges with this acquired colour the personality of her sitters. But if she can retain the technical mastery thus early achieved in the French atelier, while more fully developing her own artistic individuality, she will be able to accomplish great things.

— From an unsigned article in The Academy magazine, 6 June 1891

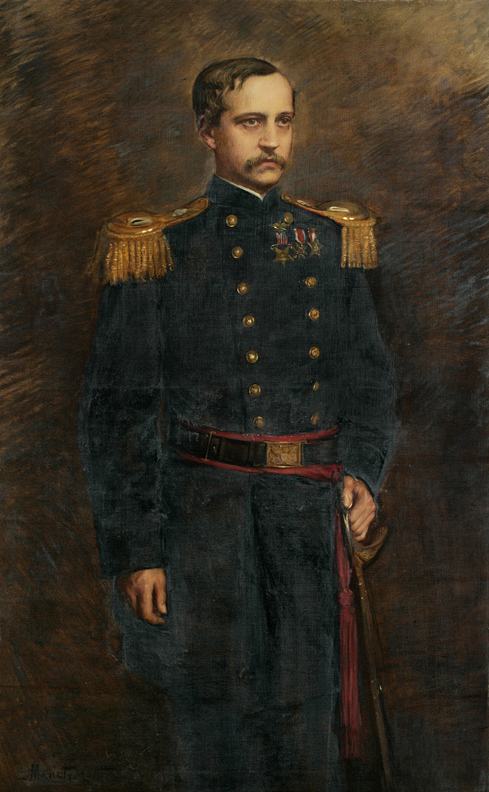
Portrait of Henry Keteltas by Mariette Leslie Cotton (1883–1884, oil on canvas, 60 1/4 x 37 1/4 inches)

In 1889 a painting of Cotton's, "Portrait of Miss S.," was accepted for exhibition at the Paris Salon of that year and proved to be the only painting by an American artist to receive an award. (Note: The Paris Salon was an annual exhibition produced at that time by the Société des artistes français The award was an honorable mention. The identity of the sitter, "Miss S." is not given in contemporary or later accounts. It is possible that she was Ethel Sands whose mother Cotton painted in a portrait, "Mrs. Mahlon Sands," exhibited at the Royal Academy in 1891. Cotton may have been introduced to her parents by their close friend and her relative, Frederick Townsend Martin. At the time Cotton made the portrait of Miss S. she was twenty-one years old and Ethel Sands was seventeen. Cotton was then training to be a professional artist and Ethel Sands aspired to be one.) In 1891 she showed two portraits—a pastel, "Mrs. Mahlon Sands," and an oil, "F. T. Martin, Esq."—at the annual exhibition at London's Royal Academy. (Note: Mrs. Mahlon Sands was a close friend of Frederick Townsend Martin. Both were socially-prominent Americans, she permanently residing in London with her husband and three children, and he traveling widely with many connections in England. In his memoir, Things I Remember (1913), he wrote that she and her husband were among his greatest friends. Mrs. Sands, he said, "was a beautiful woman who possessed a great power of attraction, and the late King [i.e., Edward VII], then Prince of Wales, liked her and her husband and honored them with many proofs of his friendship.") A review of the 1891 exhibition in Art Journal called the portraits "meritorious performances" and a review in The Royal Academy gave a more extensive evaluation, praising her "technical mastery" in an "ultra-French style" and looking forward to her development of an artistic individuality.

By 1895 Cotton had become known for portraits she had made of prominent European men including the Duke of Cambridge and Otto von Bismarck. Early that year paintings of two men to whom she had social and family connections appeared at Knoedler's Galleries in New York. One showed her husband's friend, Samuel M. Roosevelt and the other showed Howard Potter to whom Cotton was related via her husband's first marriage. (Note: Samuel Montgomery Roosevelt was a merchant and artist. In partnership first with Louis M. Howland and subsequently with Montgomery Roosevelt Schuyler (to whom, as the names suggest, he was related), he ran a wine importing and commission agent business in New York. In August 1888 Cotton's husband, J. Leslie Cotton, joined the partnership. A month earlier, he and she had married and eight months later he withdrew from the firm in order that the two of them could live abroad. Samuel Roosevelt and the Cottons remained friends and were frequently seen together by society reporters. Howard Potter was also an uncle of J. Leslie Cotton's first wife, Maria Louisa Potter. He was a philanthropist and banker with the New York firm of Brown Brothers.) Later in the year five portraits by Cotton appeared in a loan exhibition to aid two local charities. (Note: Cotton lent a self-portrait and one she had made of Miss Eleanor Winslow. Her portraits of Mrs. Albert C. Stevens, Mrs. Lucius Wilmerding, and Samuel Montgomery Roosevelt, were lent by the sitters, who had commissioned them.) A critic for The Sun singled out "Miss E. Winslow" as the best of the group, saying the portrait contained a "dignity and distinction quite apart from any charm of feature or expression." The critic also defended the dignity conveyed in two other portraits which the critic said had been unfairly criticized as "unnecessarily realistic in regard to the ravages of time." Of the self-portrait a society writer said a viewer at the exhibition would be astonished because the "smiling, young, modish society woman, seemingly coming out of the frame with outstretched hand to greet you, looked too much the woman of fashion to be the hard working artist." (Note: Eleanor Winslow was an American socialite who lived with her mother in London during the 1890s and was then considered to be "the reigning unmarried American belle" in that city. Mrs. Albert C. Stevens was a prominent American socialite considered to be "one of the handsomest matrons in New York society." She was the daughter of a New York supreme court justice, John R. Brady. Her husband was a member of a wealthy family based in Hoboken, New Jersey. In 1894 he became a partner in a liquor importing firm, much as Cotton's husband had earlier done. His club memberships and social contacts overlapped considerably with those of Cotton's husband. Mrs. L. K. Wilmerding was a Canadian who in 1876 had married the New York merchant and financier, Lucius K. Wilmerding. Cotton painted the portraits of Stevens and Wilmerding in a New York studio she had rented during the winter of 1896-1897.)

In the fall of the following year Cotton showed a self-portrait and portraits of two wealthy New Yorkers at Knoedler's. The sitters were William Seward Webb and James L. Breese. (Note: Webb was a physician who turned businessman after his marriage to one of Cornelius Vanderbilt's granddaughters. Breese was a financier and amateur photographer who owned a famous country home designed by Stanford White.) Writing in The Sun, a critic said the paintings were made "in a vigorous style unusual in a woman" and another, in the New York Times, saw the portraits as having minor defects but nonetheless showing "much promise and unusual cleverness." The New York Times critic associated Cotton's style with John Singer Sargent's, calling him her "master." The Times critic did not explain why he thought Cotton to be a follower of Sargent, but a few years later another critic noted that Cotton had received advice and criticism from him. (Note: The similarity of Sargent's and Cotton's styles probably also stemmed from their training since both had Carolus-Duran as teacher, although not at the same time. In 1904 a critic for the Times associated Cotton's style with Sargent's, saying they both showed "easy and sure" brushwork. The relationship between the two artists was apparently a cordial one. In 1904 a profile study a news reporter noticed that a "profile study" that Sargent had made of Cotton was on view in her New York studio.)

=== Mature style ===
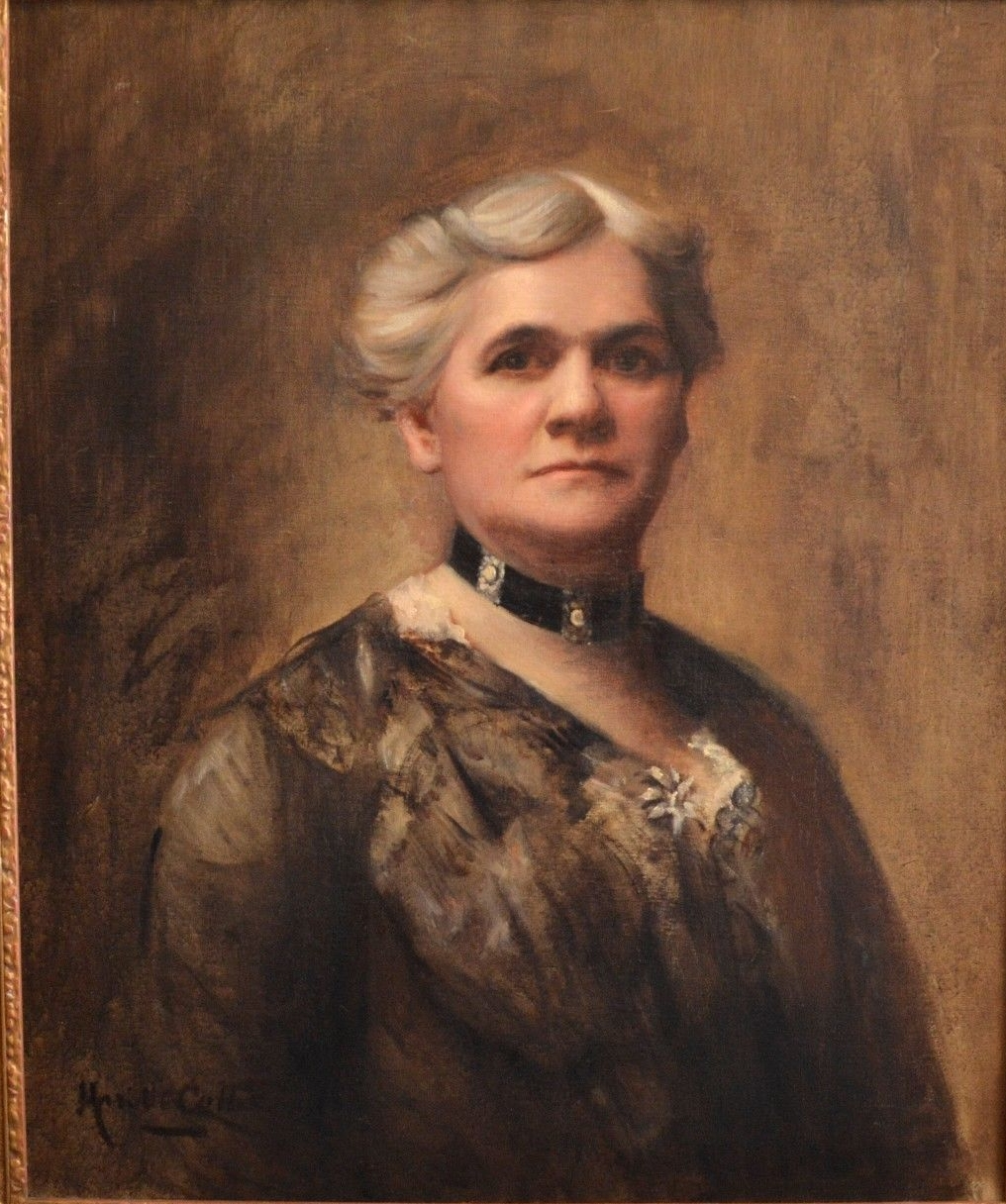
"Louisa Archer Thornton" by Mariette Leslie Cotton (1905, oil on canvas)

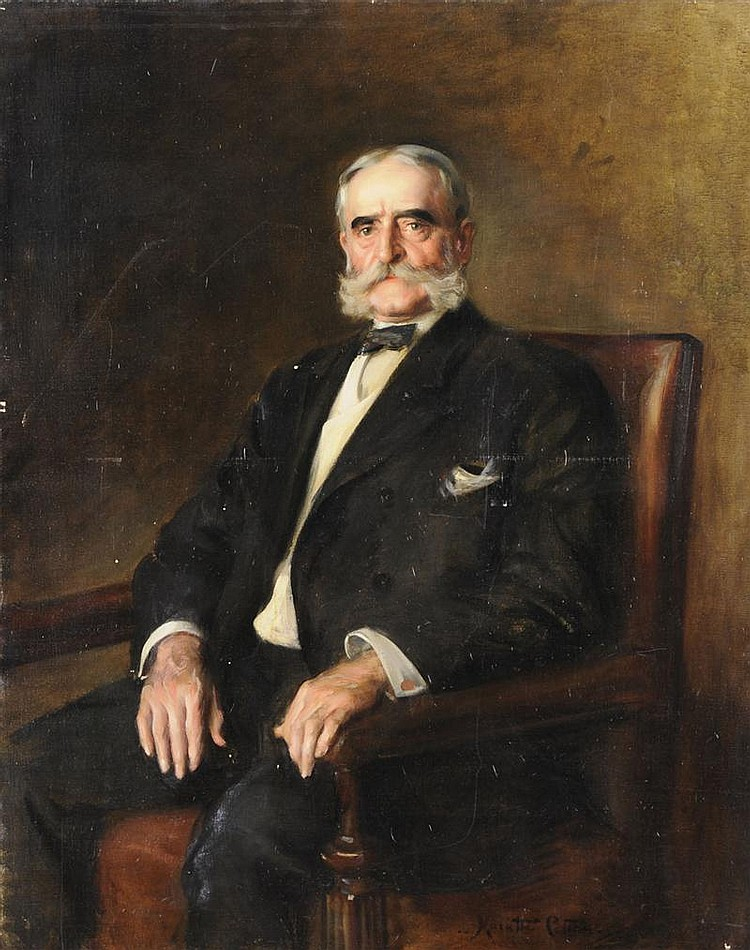
"Brayton C. Ives" by Mariette Leslie Cotton (1907, oil on canvas, 50 x 40 inches)

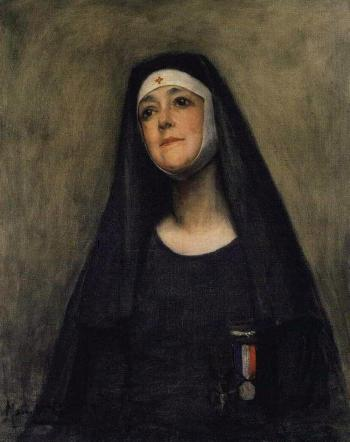
"Lady Mendl infirmiere pendant la guerre" by Mariette Leslie Cotton (circa 1918, oil on canvas, 30 x 23 inches)

Portrait of Col. William Wright Harts by Mariette Leslie Cotton (oil on canvas)

In 1900 Cotton showed five portraits at Knoedler's. The exhibition attracted the attention of critics who praised her versatility and evident sympathy with her sitters as well as the "dash and spirit" of her style. Her relationship with Knoedler's continued with exhibitions every few years from 1901 through 1921. Critics liked the 1901 show, one praising improvement in her work. (Note: Positive reviews appeared in the New York Herald, New York Times, and New York Evening Post.) When twenty-one portraits appeared at Knoedler's in 1904, reviewers praised her character research, directness and simplicity, and clever brushwork. One of them also noted her "ability to secure a good likeness, much power of characterization, and as a rule good drawing and effective color." A reviewer also noted an unevenness in the show, some portraits giving evidence of having been rushed or given only perfunctory attention. (Note: Subjects of the portraits were, as usual, "well known men and women of society." They included wealthy American businessmen and their families as well as the actress, Ethel Barrymore. One of the portraits apparently caused a minor sensation. It showed Mrs. Albert Clifford Barney in a flowing garment that seemed about to slip off her shoulders. The sitter was an artist who shared a studio with Cotton at the time and the red garment was found to be "the kimono Mrs. Barney always wears when she is at work in her studio.") In 1906 Cotton was seen to have "a brilliant career before her," already earning enough from commissioned portraits to support herself and her family. By this time her sitters were increasingly from European countries, many of them titled. Two of these were women who had befriended Cotton, Lady Cunard and Lady Savile. Lady Bache Cunard was the former Maude Alice Burke, an American from a wealthy New York family. She had married an English baronet named Bache Edward Cunard who was a grandson of the founder of the Cunard Line. Prominent in London social circles, she was a noted promoter of literary and artistic careers. Gertrude Lady Savile, who was raised in a well-connected English family, developed strong ties in the United States after she married a man who had a diplomatic appointment at the British embassy in Washington, D.C. During her stay in the country she became "the toast of the town not only in the national capital, but also in New York." After her first husband's untimely death, she married another diplomat, John Savile, who, on the death of a childless uncle, also named John Savile, inherited a title, 2nd Baron Savile, and much wealth. Like Lady Cunard, Lady Savile was a highly respected London society matron. Acting somewhat in competition with each other, the two women worked to advance Cotton's career in London. With their help she was able to obtain commissions from a growing list of titled English sitters including Lord Howard de Walden; the daughter of a duke, Lady Marjorie Manners; and a Lady in Waiting to the Queen, the Honorable Violet Vivian. While in Marienbad during the summer of 1907, Cotton began work on a portrait of an English socialite named Mrs. Hall Walker. A close friend of Edward VII, Walker provided Cotton with an introduction that resulted in a request from the king that she paint his portrait as well. Mrs. Hall Walker, later Baroness Wavertree, was a popular hostess seen as liking to surround herself with beautiful women such as Cotton. Begun in Marienbad, the portrait was completed the following winter at Cotton's London studio. (Note: Rather than having her come to Buckingham Palace, the king came to Cotton's studio in Chelsea.) When the portrait was shown in an exhibition at Knoedler's later that year, a critic praised an innovative informality of clothing and pose which revealed the king's amiability without compromising his dignity. The portrait pleased him so much that he commissioned another, more formal, portrait of himself and one of the queen. Early in 1914, Cotton brought some of her London portraits to New York for exhibition at Knoedler's eliciting this concise evaluation from a critic for the Brooklyn Daily Eagle: "There is little doubt of the talent of Mrs. Leslie Cotton, who shows portraits in oil, in the upper gallery at Knoedler's, for she paints with conviction, with much feeling and with convincing result."

From the time of her marriage through the 1920s Cotton lived mainly in London and Paris, making frequent visits to New York. She showed her work infrequently in New York galleries, instead inviting acquaintances to her studio to see recently completed portraits and ones still in progress. These events, usually afternoon teas, became popular among the social set in which she moved. (Note: So, for example, society reporters noted that Cotton invited guests to see her work in 1903 , 1906, 1913, and 1930.) On the occasions that she did show her work in New York galleries the exhibitions were widely reported in the press. For example, when in 1917 she showed fifteen portraits she had made in Paris over the previous few years, the exhibition attracted notice from the New York Herald, the Christian Science Monitor, the Sun, the Schenectady Gazette, American Art News, and the Fine Arts Journal. Reviewers praised the show in general, saw some unevenness in the quality of her work, and were impressed with both the social standing and attractiveness of her sitters. (Note: A critic for the New York Herald described the portraits and said "Mrs. Cotton is an experienced and able painter of portraits." The Christian Science Monitor reported Cotton's "fashionable who's-whos of New York and Paris at Reinhardt's." The Sun contained a lengthy review by a noted critic, Henry McBride who commented on Cotton's vivid realization of her subjects, her intense interest in her subjects, and the artistic skill the portraits show. The Schenectady Gazette claimed Cotton as one born in that city and called the show "one of the most important art exhibitions in New York at the present time." The review in American Art News was more critical than the others, contrasting paintings seen to be "solidly painted, good and true in color, with excellently done details and natural expression," with others, "weak in construction, and artificial in effect." The Fine Arts Journal contained an extract from McBride's review in the Sun.) One influential critic, Henry McBride, said "Mrs. Cotton realizes her personages for us so vividly that one is tempted to run off into personal gossip rather than to thread the tedious intricacies of a discussion of artistic technique." During the years when she made her home abroad Cotton had paintings accepted for exhibition in the annual Paris Salons. Her appearances were infrequent early in her career and nearly annual during the 1920s. (Note: In addition to the Salon of 1889, she showed in 1903, 1904, 1907, 1912, 1913, 1914, 1920, 1921, 1922, 1923, 1925, 1927, 1928, 1930, and 1931.)

1926

Mrs. Cotton, who works in Paris, appears to enjoy an enviable degree of popularity, if one may judge from the formidable array of distinguished sitters who have passed through her studio. ... The painter's popularity has a sound basis, for her portraits combine such abstract artistic qualities as effective and infinitely varied design and daringly unconventional arrangements of color, with strong characterization and a likeness that never fails to be convincing. Her concern with the artistic problem never makes her obtrude her own personality or offend the sitter's susceptibilities.

— P. G. Konody, writing in the New York Times, 12 December 1926

Throughout her career Cotton moved about frequently and had no permanent or even long-term studio. She sometimes worked in hotel rooms and occasionally stayed in a private home as the guest of one of her sitters. During the winter of 1902-1903 she painted Mrs. Henry Flagler at her home in Palm Beach. In August 1903 she stayed with one of her sitters, Mrs. William B. Leeds, as her guest in Bar Harbor on the Leeds's yacht and by December of that year she had a studio in New York that was likened to a drawing room complete with luxurious old tapestries. A year later she was painting in a studio within an apartment hotel, the Schuyler, on West 45th Street. In 1906 she occupied rooms in a London townhouse owned by her friend, Lady Savile. The following summer, when she began work on her portrait of King Edward, she had a studio in Marienbad and while completing that portrait during the winter months she was occupying a studio on Tite Street in Chelsea that had formerly been used by James McNeill Whistler. In 1913 her she had another London studio, this one on Devonshire Street, and two years later, in the midst of World War I, she was working in Paris. Returning to the United States in 1916, she painted portraits in private houses and had no studio. During the 1920s she worked mainly in Paris studios and thereafter, until the end of her life, mainly in New York.

=== The society woman as professional artist ===
During the time that Cotton was establishing herself as a professional artist reporters found it odd that an influential society woman would, as one of them said, challenge the successful male portraitists such as Sargent or George Burroughs Torrey. Another showed surprise that a woman would prefer to be better known as artist than as hostess. A third saw her as a type of new woman such as Gertrude Vanderbilt Whitney, Edith Wharton, Emily Post, and other successful women in American literature and the arts. As a fourth put it, "The true American society woman does not think millions an excuse for idleness." A fifth echoed this sentiment and elaborated: "In the circles of great wealth are a dozen women who are doing meritorious work with brush, pen, and chisel. And they are professionals in the fullest sense of the word. ... In every case they are professionals because they wish to be tested on the broadest basis of merit. Hence they put their work side by side with the product of those who make their living in such ways and let the purchaser decide which is the most meritorious."

Throughout her career critics noted Cotton's popularity with the public and her success in gaining prestigious commissions. They found much to like in many of her portraits but some complained of unevenness in her output and even sloppy handling. In 1917 a reviewer said, "Mrs. Cotton is a disappointing painter in that her work varies so greatly, some of it unusually good, and some of it so weak as to make it difficult to understand how it could proceed from the same brush." In 1926 another reviewer attributed at least some of this variability to a necessary compromise. As a professional portraitist she was obliged to please her subjects. This meant that at least some of the time she had to balance her desire to create good art with the sitter's desire to be presented in a certain way. The reviewer suggested that Cotton's best work was made when she painted "for her own pleasure" and was not forced to make this compromise.

After she turned sixty years old, Cotton rarely showed her work and attracted little notice from the press. She attended the occasional social function, including a function at the White House at the invitation of Eleanor Roosevelt in 1940, but seems to have remained quietly in New York during the last years of her life.

== Personal life ==
At the time of her birth Cotton's family lived on the campus of Union College. Although both her parents had ties to it, neither worked at the school. Her father, Samuel Tweedy Benedict, had entered as a freshman in 1856 and graduated in 1860. He went on to become a lawyer and state legislator. Her mother, Julia Averill Jackson Benedict, was a daughter of Isaac Jackson, who had taught at the college and who, by living with them after his retirement, helped assure that they were welcome to make their home there. Sources vary as to the year of her birth. They give May 17 as month and day, but some give 1866 as year and others give 1868. The sources most likely to be accurate give the former. (Note: Cotton gave 1868 as birth year in a passport application of 1921. Some modern sources do the same. The passport application contains other inaccuracies raising doubts about the accuracy of the birth year and it is understandable that modern sources would use that readily available, though inaccurate, source. A book of family history published in 1878 gives 1866 as does her death record and that is the presumptive year in the U.S. Census reports of 1870 and 1880.) Cotton received at least part of her early education at home from a governess.

As noted above, Cotton may have received early art training from her mother and a Union College art teacher. When she was twenty Cotton married a man who had connections both to her family and to Union College. Her husband was Joseph Leslie Cotton whose connection to Cotton and Union College came via his first marriage to Maria Louisa Potter who had died in childbirth six years before. She was the granddaughter of Alonzo Potter, a Union College vice president, and Sarah Maria Nott Potter, daughter of the school's president. (Note: It seems likely that Cotton and her future husband met at Union College where she was living and to which he would have made frequent family visits.) (Note: William Appleton Potter, who taught art at Union College, and who may have given Cotton informal instruction, was a step brother of her father who, later in life, earned his living as an architect.) Cotton was herself related to the Potter family, although the relationship was apparently a distant one. (Note: In 1896 a news report stated that a "Bishop Potter of New York" was related to Cotton but did not state how. Bishop Potter was Henry C. Potter, bishop of the Episcopal Diocese of New York and brother of Clarkson Potter, the father of J. Leslie Potter's first wife. Following the death of his first wife, Sarah Potter, Maria Potter's grandfather, Alonzo Potter, had married Sarah (or Sally) Benedict whose family came from Connecticut. Since Cotton's father, Samuel Benedict, also came from a Connecticut family, there is some chance that Cotton's family relationship with the Potters was via Sarah Benedict.) Cotton was seen to have an attractive personality and appearance. Shortly after her marriage a reporter called attention to her beauty and some years later she was included among the women featured in An American Book of Beauty (New York, Harper & Bros., 1904). In 1903 and again in 1907 she was credited with great charm of manner.

Cotton's husband, Joseph Leslie Cotton, was born in Barbados in 1856 to Dudley Page Cotton and Rebecca Jane Roach Cotton. Dudley P. Cotton was a successful merchant, trading in the West Indies, who belonged to a wealthy and well connected family based originally in New Hampshire. (Note: J. Leslie Cotton's brother, Henry Evan Cotton, was an Episcopal minister who participated in the wedding ceremony of Cotton and J. Leslie. Two other brothers, William D. Cotton and Nathaniel H. Cotton, ran the shipping business their father had founded. Nathaniel's daughter, Lillian, became a professional artist.) At the time of his first marriage J. Leslie Cotton had lived in Boston and managed a ranch in Wyoming Territory. By the time he married Cotton in 1888 he had joined with two friends in a New York firm that imported wine and spirits from Europe. (Note: The friends were Samuel M. Roosevelt and Montgomery R. Schuyler. The firm was Roosevelt & Schuyler. Roosevelt and J. Leslie Cotton were frequent companions in the New York and Newport social scenes.) He left the firm when he and Cotton, then married, decided to live abroad. The couple's wealth together with Cotton's gift for social advancement enabled them to gain acceptance within the British aristocracy and a few years after their arrival in London they were granted the privilege of a presentation to the Court at Buckingham Palace. While living in both Paris and London they were known for the "entertainments" they hosted. In 1893, while staying in London, their first and only child was born, a son named Hugh Dudley Benedict Cotton. By 1901 J. Leslie Cotton had re-established himself in New York and was working as an architect. (Note: In the 1870s he had attended the Massachusetts Institute of Technology.) Cotton continued to reside mainly abroad and during her visits to the United States the society press would make note of events that the two of them attended together. Increasingly, however, their social activities would be reported separately and in 1916 it was apparent that they were separated when they both attended a performance at the Metropolitan Opera yet sat in separate boxes. When their son married in New York in 1920 a New York address was given for his father and his mother was listed as "Mrs. Cotton of Paris." By 1921 they had divorced and at J. Leslie Cotton's death in 1929 the New York Times obituary listed survivors but made no mention of Cotton as former wife.

== Other names ==
Cotton generally used Mrs. Leslie Cotton as her professional name, but early in her career she was called (in France) Mlle. M. Cotton and Miss or Mrs. Mariette Cotton (in the United States). After her divorce she sometimes used Mariette Leslie Cotton or Mariette Cotton.

Apart from professional use, the names used for her include the following:

- Miss Mariette Benedict, her maiden name, sometimes given as Miss Marietta Benedict.
- Pansy Benedict, her nickname.
- Mrs. Leslie-Cotton.
- Mrs. Marietta Leslie Cotton.
- Marietta Benedict Cotton.
Gallery
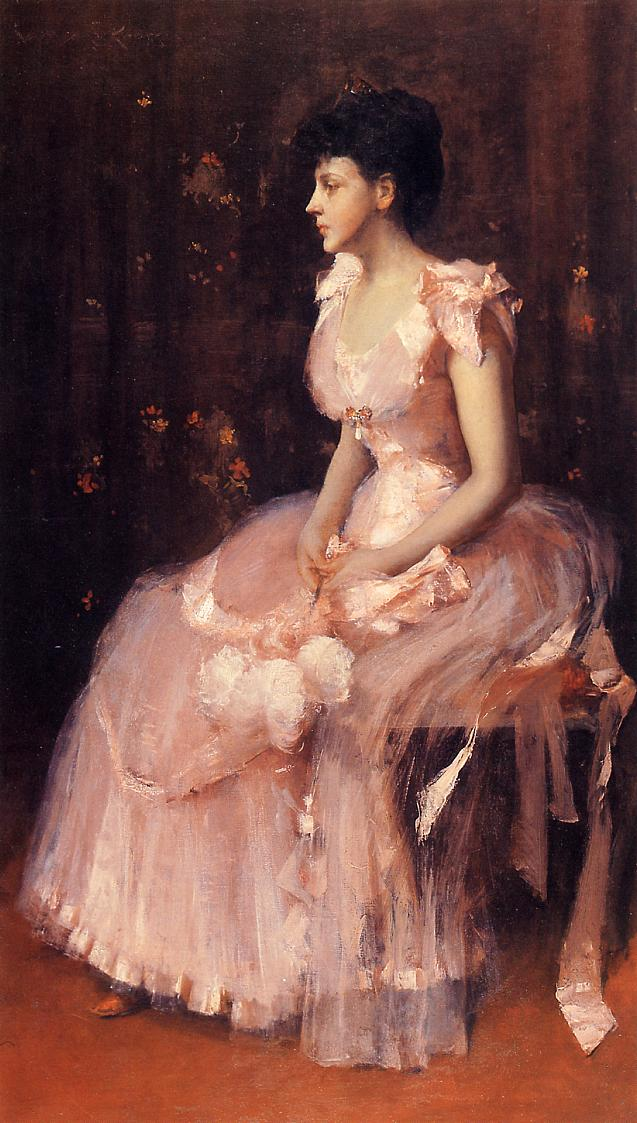
"Lady in Pink," a portrait of Mariette Leslie Cotton by William Merritt Chase (1888-89, oil on canvas, 70 1/4 x 40 1/4 inches)

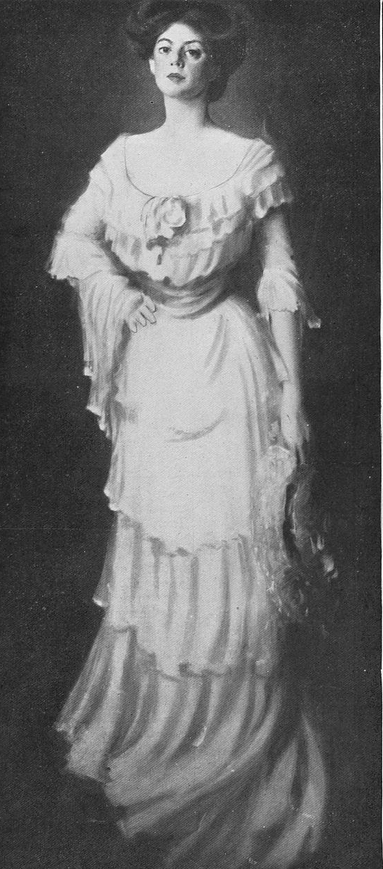
"Miss Ethyl Barrymore" by Mariette Leslie Cotton reproduction of an oil portrait from American Art News, Vol. 3, No. 62 (Jan. 14, 1905), p. 1

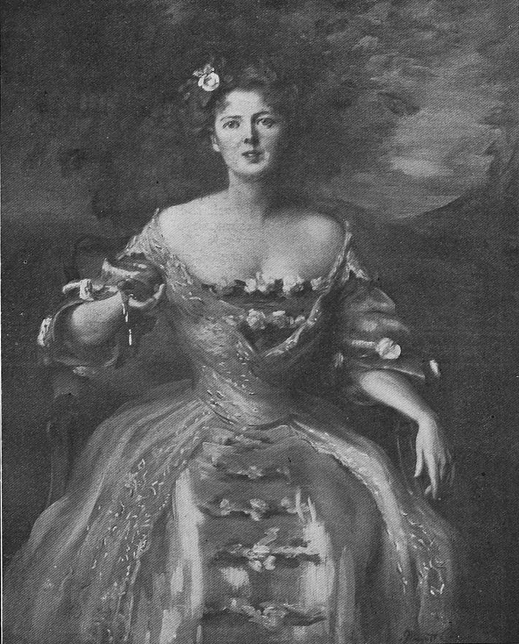
"Lady Bache Cunard" by Mariette Leslie Cotton, reproduction of an oil portrait appearing in American Art News, Vol. 3, No. 76 (Apr. 22, 1905), p. 1

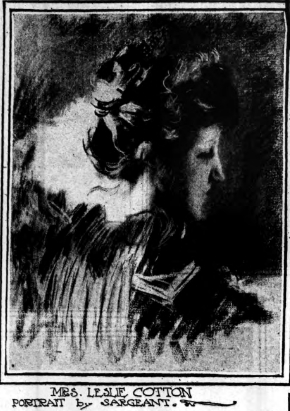
Sketch portrait of Mariette Leslie Cotton by John Singer Sargent, reproduction appearing in the New York Herald, March 22, 1908, p. 4
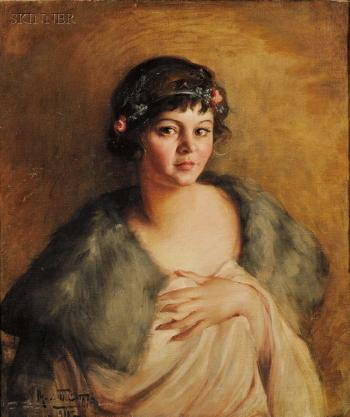
"Portrait of Flora" by Mariette Leslie Cotton (1915, oil on canvas, 28.70 x 24.26 inches)

A Woman of New York Society by Mariette Leslie Cotton (circa 1920, oil on Canvas, 25 x 21 inches)

Mistinguette by Mariette Leslie Cotton (circa 1922, oil on Canvas, 79 3/4 x 46 inches)

Queen Elizabeth The Queen Mother by Mariette Leslie Cotton (circa 1936, oil on Canvas, 28 1/8 x 24 inches)

== Portraits ==
A list of people who were well known among their contemporaries for whom Cotton made portraits. (Note: The sources of entries in this list are contemporary news reports.)

- Lady Abdy, probably the second wife of Sir William Neville Abdy, 2nd Baronet
- Alexandra of Denmark, Queen consort of the United Kingdom
- Princess Anastasia of Greece and Denmark, formerly Mrs. William B. Leeds, an American, born Nancy Stewart Worthington
- Comtesse d'Aramont
- Alice Pike Barney, Mrs. Albert Clifford Barney, studio partner of Cotton
- Children of Mrs. Hugh Baxter; she was an American, the former Mildred Eytinge
- Ethel Barrymore, the famous actress
- Comtesse de Belazichy, formerly Mabel Elizabeth Wright, wife of Count Béla Mária Rudolf Zichy de Zich et Vásonkeő of Hungary
- Countess Bernsdorf, formerly Jeanne Luckemeyer of New York, wife of Johann Heinrich von Bernstorff
- Gen. Pierre Berdoulat of the French army
- Mrs. Rupert Becket
- Otto von Bismarck
- Jérôme Napoléon Bonaparte
- Mr. James L. Breese, architect and friend of Stanford White
- Leone Caetani aka Prince Caetani
- Prince George, Duke of Cambridge,
- Miss Catherine Cameron and her dog
- Luisa Casati, art patron, wife of Marchese Casati Stampa di Soncinoi
- Boni de Castellane, Marquis de Castellan, husband of Anna Gould
- Marquise Castellane with dog, formerly Anna Gould
- Duc de Chaulnes, grandson of an American millionaire, Theodore P. Shonts
- Herbert Eaton, 3rd Baron Cheylesmore, husband of an American wife, Elizabeth Richardson French
- Prince Christopher of Greece and Denmark, husband of American-born Princess Anastasia of Greece and Denmark
- Viscountess Churchill, Verena Maud (née Lowther), wife of 1st Viscount Churchill, daughter of 3rd Earl of Lonsdale
- Edward Villiers, 5th Earl of Clarendon, British Liberal Unionist politician from the Villiers family
- Lady Diana Cooper, British aristocrat, socialite of London and Paris
- Hugh Dudley Cotton, Cotton's only child
- Mr. J. Leslie Cotton, Cotton's husband
- Maud Cunard, Lady Bache Cunard, born Maud Alice Burke in the United States
- Dr. Holbrook Curtis, voice therapist at the Metropolitan Opera
- Mary Curzon, Baroness Curzon of Kedleston, first Lady Curzon, born Mary Victoria Leiter in the United States
- Grace Curzon, Marchioness Curzon of Kedleston, second Lady Curzon, born Grace Elvina Hinds, daughter of J. Monroe Hinds, an American ambassador
- Miss Madeline Cutting, a socialite known for appearing hatless outdoors
- Col. Walter Cutting and grandchild
- Marchese Davalos, Cuban
- Mr. John V. Dahlgren, son of socialite Elizabeth Wharton Drexel
- Miss Ethel Davies, a cousin of Cotton's, daughter of a prominent lawyer, Julien T. Davies
- Elsie de Wolfe, called Lady Mendl, an American actress and interior decorator who spent much of her life in Paris
- Lady Decies, formerly Elizabeth Wharton Drexel, an American author and Manhattan socialite
- Chauncey Depew, lawyer and United States Senator
- Children of Anthony Joseph Drexel Jr., American banker
- Miss Caroline King Duer, editor of 'Vogue' magazine
- Marchioness of Dufferin and Ava, who was Miss Florence Davis, daughter of John H. Davis of New York
- Edward VII, King of the United Kingdom (two portraits)
- Queen Elizabeth The Queen Mother, wife of King George VI and the mother of Queen Elizabeth II
- Children of Mrs. Jean L. Elliott
- Maxine Elliott, an American actress and theatrical producer
- Infanta Eulalia of Spain, member of the Spanish royal family who made a controversial visit to the United States in 1893
- Princess Jean Ghika, born Hazel-Marie Paliner-Singer
- James Cardinal Gibbons, American Cardinal
- Mrs. Robert Goelet, longtime resident in France, wife of Robert Walton Goelet, born Anne Marie Guestier
- Duc de Gramont, senior member of the French nobility
- Duchesse de Gramont
- Elliott Gregory, artist and writer
- Ogden H. Hammond, American ambassador to Spain
- Col. William Wright Harts, American officer and civil servant
- Clara von Hatzfeldt, Princess of Hatzfeldt-Wildenburg, born Clara Huntington in the United States
- Thomas Scott-Ellis, 8th Baron Howard de Walden, English peer and arts patron
- Lord Robert Edward Innes-Ker, husband of the music hall actress José Collins and son of James Innes-Ker, 7th Duke of Roxburghe
- Gen. Brayton Ives, American railroad magnate and president of the New York Stock Exchange
- Miss Fanny Jones, daughter of Lewis Quentin Jones of Newport, R.I.
- Henry Keteltas, a brevet lieutenant colonel in the Union Army from a wealthy New York family
- Mrs. Ladenburg and child
- Mrs. George Law, wife of George Law, an American financier
- Mr. Henry Symes Lehr, American socialite, husband of Elizabeth Wharton Drexel
- Mrs. John Leslie
- Princess Lichtenstein
- Prince Louis of Spain
- Lady Marjorie Manners, after her marriage, Marchioness of Anglesey, was a British writer on art and illustrator
- Alexandre Millerand, President of France
- Mistinguett, French actress and singer, born Jeanne Florentine Bourgeois
- Consuelo Montagu, Duchess of Manchester was a Cuban-American socialite
- Mr. Frederick Townsend Martin, American social arbiter
- Arthur Mugnier, l'abbé Meugnier, participant in the Parisian arts community
- M. de Monbrison
- Miss Moore
- Mrs. Jordan L. Mott wife of Jordan L. Mott, American inventor and industrialist
- Dr. Nansen
- Miss Petitnus
- Mr. Sanford Pomeroy, American artist having a studio in Paris
- Mr. Howard Potter, banker and philanthropist and a relative of Cotton's
- Mr. Ralph Pulitzer, newspaper publisher
- François-Alfred-Gaston XVI, Duc de La Rochefoucauld, and his wife the former Matti-Elizabeth Mitchell of Portland, Oregon
- Auguste Rodin, French sculptor
- Mme. Roger-Micios, an actress
- Mr. Samuel M. Roosevelt, American socialite and artist
- Mrs. Horatio Rubens, wealthy businessman who aided Cuban insurgents
- Miss Ida Rubinstein, Russian ballet dancer
- Miss S. (possibly Ethel Sands)
- Mrs. Mahlon A. Sands, wife of a wealthy American businessman and mother of Ethel Sands
- Gertrude Lady Savile, socially prominent wife of John Savile
- Mrs. Henri St. Paul de Sincay, who was Miss Marie L. Logan
- Mlle. Andrée Spinelly, French actress
- Mrs. Charles Albert Stevens, formerly May Brady
- Mrs. Rutherford Stuyvesant
- Countess Suzanet
- Marquise de Taillerand, wife of Hélie de Talleyrand-Périgord, Duke of Sagan, an American, born Anna Gould
- Mrs. Louisa Archer Thornton, wife of Col. John C. C. Thornton
- Children of Duchesse de Torlonia
- Sir Herbert Beerbohm Tree, English actor and theater manager
- Princesse Villa Rosa
- Miss Violet Vivian, maid of honor to Queen Alexandra
- Mrs. Hall Walker, Baroness Wavertree, born Sophie Florence Lothrop Sheridan in Dorset, UK, married William Walker, 1st Baron Wavertree
- Dr. William Seward Webb, an American businessman
- Mrs. Lucius Wilmerding, formerly Helen Cutting
- Miss Eleanor Winslow, an American artist
- Felix Yusupov, Russian prince
- Comtese Bela R. Zichy, an American, formerly Miss Mabel Wright
