= Metropolitan Trust Company =

American trust company

- Industry: Trust company
- Founded: 1881
- Fate: Merged with Chatham and Phenix National Bank (1925)
- Headquarters: New York City, New York
- Key people: Thomas Hillhouse; Brayton Ives; George C. Van Tuyl Jr. Samuel McRoberts
- Products: Financial services

The Metropolitan Trust Company of the City of New York was a trust company located in New York City that was founded in 1881. The trust company merged with the Chatham and Phenix National Bank in 1925 under the name of the Chatham Phenix National Bank and Trust Company of New York.

== History ==
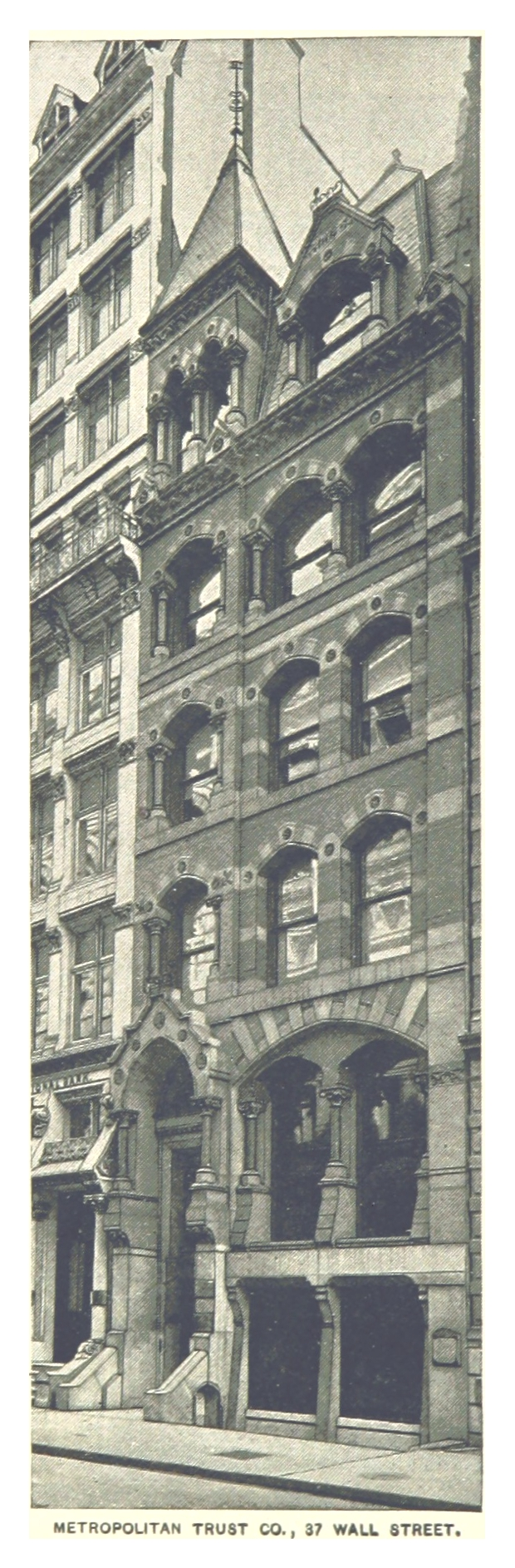
Metropolitan Trust Co., 37 Wall Street, c. 1893

The company opened its doors at 41 Pine Street in Manhattan on November 28, 1881, although it had planned to open on December 1, 1881 but change was "necessary by causes which the gentleman interested in the new enterprise hails as a pleasant augury." The first president of the company was Gen. Thomas Hillhouse, who had just resigned as the Assistant Treasurer of the United States in New York City (following eleven years in that position after being appointed by President Ulysses S. Grant in 1870. (Note: The founding trustees of the Trust Company were: Collis P. Huntington, John T. Terry, Morris K. Jesup, A. Gracie King, Isaac Newton Phelps, Darius O. Mills, Thomas Hillhouse, Joseph W. Drexel, Edwards S. Sanford, Frederick D. Tappen, Hugh J. Jewett (president of the Erie Railroad), Parker Handy, Henry E. Pellew, Edwin D. Morgan Jr., James J. Higginson, Oliver Prince Buel, Robert H. Pruyn, Dudley Olcott (president of the Mechanics' and Farmers' Bank of Albany), Freeman Clarke, George A. Hardin, Edward B. Judson, Phineas Prouty, and John F. Slater.) Along with Hillhouse, Walter J. Brittin, formerly Cashier and Chief Clerk of the Sub-Treasury, joined the Trust Company as Secretary, and Frederick D. Tappen, president of the Gallatin National Bank joined as Vice President. Several large investors had approached Hillhouse with large sums of money and he had to place them with the Bank of Commerce, which was chosen as a depositing bank for the Metropolitan. The company had capital of $1,000,000, half of which was paid in and invested in United States bonds and the other half which had been called as of the opening. Hillhouse remained president until his death in July 1897.

Following the death of Hillhouse, Brayton Ives became the second president of the Metropolitan Trust Company. Before the Trust Company, Ives had been president of the Western Bank (which had merged with the Bank of Commerce) and president of the Northern Pacific Railway and President of the New York Stock Exchange. (Note: By May 1910, the directors of the Metropolitan Trust Company were: Francis M. Bacon, William L. Bull, William Carpender, Beverly Chew, Thomas DeWitt Cuyler, Henry W. DeForest, Haley Fiske, J. Horace Harding, Erskine Hewitt, Brayton Ives, Lewis Cass Ledyard, Bradley Martin, Frederick T. Martin, Walter E. Maynard, Ogden Mills, E. D. Morgan, Richard Mortimer, John E. Parsons, Charles M. Pratt, Anton A. Raven, Norman B. Ream, George R. Sheldon, J. Edward Simmons, John W. Simpson, Joseph J. Slocum, John T. Terry, George Henry Warren II, and Horace White.) He served as president for fifteen years until his poor health required him to resign in 1912. The presidency remained vacant until April 1914 when George C. Van Tuyl Jr. was elected president and resigned as New York State Superintendent of Banks.

Van Tuyl served as president until 1920. During his tenure, the deposits of the company grew from $27,000,000 to $39,000,000 and was located at 49 Wall Street. Van Tuyl was succeeded by Harold I. Pratt. Pratt's tenure was short-lived, however, as he resigned on September 1, 1921 but stayed on as acting president until his successor was elected. In 1921, Harold B. Thorne, vice president of the Trust Company, announced that Metropolitan was moving from their current office at 60 Wall Street, had taken over the office space of the Liberty branch of the New York Trust Company in the Equitable Building with a fourteen year lease beginning on January 1, 1922. (Note: By December 1921, the directors of the Metropolitan Trust Company were: Theodore C. Camp, William Carpender, Pierre C. Cartier, Beverly Chew, Thomas DeWitt Cuyler, Cornelius Eldert, Haley Fiske, Harold Herrick, Erskine Hewitt, Arthur A. Houghton, Henry W. Marsh, Raymond T. Marshall, Bradley Martin, Walter E. Maynard, Ogden Mills, Charles W. Ogden, Herbert Parsons, Harold I. Pratt, William Ross Proctor, Cornelius A. Pugsley, Joseph J. Slocum, Harold B. Thorne, Alfred P. Walker, and Joseph Walker Jr.) In December 1921, the company moved approximately $1,000,000 in securities, gold and currency from their old office to the new office at 120 Broadway.

In 1922 Major General Samuel McRoberts became the fifth president of Metropolitan Trust. McRoberts, an attorney who had served as general manager of Armour and Company, president of the Illinois Tunnel Company and vice president of the National City Bank of New York was well known for his contributions to the Allies during World War I in the United States Army Ordnance Department.

=== Merger with Chatham and Phenix National Bank ===
In January 1925, it was announced that the Metropolitan Trust Company, which had resources of $61,907,998, was to merge with the Chatham and Phenix National Bank, which had total resources of $226,901,582, under the name of the Chatham Phenix National Bank and Trust Company of New York, the first time a national bank in New York City was permitted to use the name "Trust Company". Metropolitan president McRoberts became chairman of the board of directors of the combined entity and Chatham and Phenix leader Louis G. Kaufman became president. In March 1925, $250,000,000 worth of securities were "moved in four armored cars, guarded by machine guns, from the vaults of the old Metropolitan Trust Company, in the Equitable Building at 120 Broadway, to the Chatham and Phenix National Bank in the Singer Building, at 149 Broadway." The new company had resources of around $300,000,000 and retained the roughly 330 employees of Chatham and Phenix and the 175 employees of Metropolitan. At the time of its formation, it was one of the ten largest banks in the United States. In 1932, the company merged with the Manufacturers Trust.

=== Leadership of Metropolitan Trust ===
- 1881–1897: Thomas Hillhouse
- 1898–1912: Brayton Ives
- 1914–1920: George C. Van Tuyl Jr.
- 1920–1921: Harold I. Pratt
- 1922–1925: Samuel McRoberts
