= Chatham Phenix National Bank and Trust Company of New York =

American bank

- Formerly: Chatham and Phenix National Bank
- Industry: Banking
- Predecessors: Chatham National Bank (1812-1911); Phenix National Bank (1850-1911)
- Founded: 1911 (as Chatham and Phenix National Bank); 1925 (as Chatham Phenix National Bank and Trust Company of New York)
- Fate: Acquired in 1932 by Manufacturers Trust
- Headquarters: Singer Building, New York City, United States
- Areas served: United States
- Key people: Louis G. Kaufman (President); George M. Hard (Chairman)
- Divisions: Chatham Phenix Corporation, Chatham Phenix Allied Corporation

The Chatham Phenix National Bank and Trust Company was a bank in New York City connected with the Chatham Phenix Corporation. Its predecessor Chatham and Phenix National Bank was formed in 1911 when Chatham National Bank paid $1,880,000 to absorb the asset of the Phenix National Bank. The bank grew significantly as it absorbed smaller banking institutions, such as Mutual Alliance Trust Company and Century Bank in 1915, at which point Chatham and Phenix National Bank became the "first national bank to operate branches in the same city with the main bank."

Chatham Phenix National Bank and Trust Company of New York was organized in 1925 with resources of around $300,000,000. At the time of its formation, it was one of the ten largest banks in the United States. In 1932, the company merged with the Manufacturers Trust.

== History ==
=== Phenix Bank and Chatham Bank ===
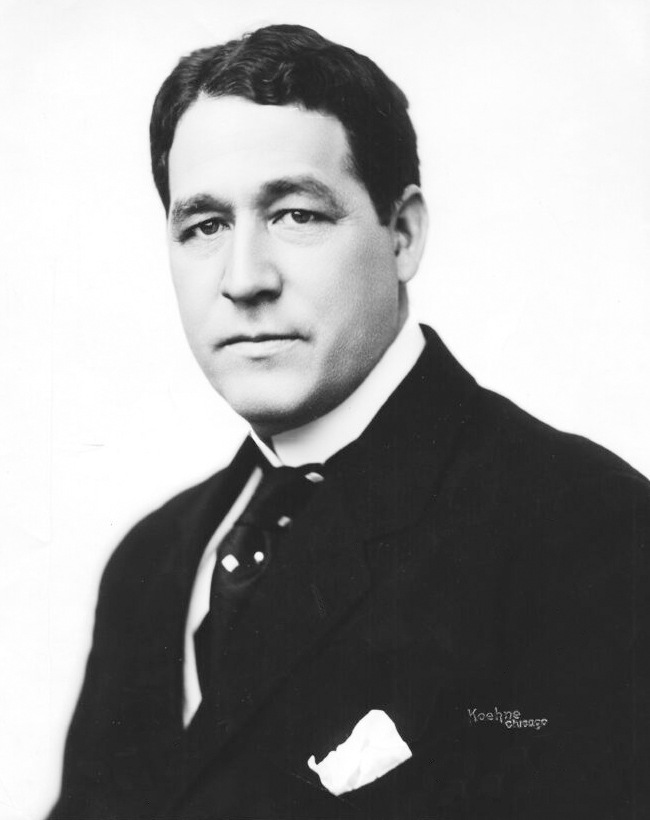
Louis G. Kaufman became president of Chatham National Bank of New York in 1910, overseeing its merger with Phenix National a year later.

Phenix Bank was established in 1812 as the banking division of the New York Manufacturing Company, which made cotton looms and supplies. As the banking division initially focused on selling wire, it was named Wire Bank, becoming an independent institution in 1817 under the name Phenix Bank, with headquarters at 24 Wall Street. In 1894, the Lombard & Ayres company of New York was worth $1,000,000, and the majority of its assets were kept in the Phenix National Bank in London, where Josiah Lombard was the director.

The Chatham Bank was established in 1850. On August 14, 1910, it was reported that George M. Hard had resigned as president of Chatham National Bank after fifty years with the bank, and had been elected chairman by the board. Shortly after becoming a member of the Chatham board, after Hard, Louis Graveraet Kaufman became the president of Chatham National Bank of New York, although only after receiving special dispensation allowing him to remain president of First National Bank of Marquette. When Kaufman became president of Chatham, the bank's deposits were about $7,000,000.

=== 1911: Merger of Phenix and Chatham ===
In 1911, Chatham National Bank of New York's president brought about a merger with Chatham National Bank of New York and Phenix National. In the early 1911 deal, Chatham National paid $1,880,000 to absorb the asset of the Phenix National Bank, creating Chatham and Phenix National. Deposits of the two banks as of January 7, 1911 was $17,957,209. The New York Times wrote that the Chatham Phenix National Bank and Trust Company was helped to be started by "J. Pierpont Morgan, the renowned American financier." At one point, the Astor and Goelet estates were identified with the institution.

=== 1915-1924: Acquisitions and branches ===
In 1915, Century Bank was absorbed, as well as its branches, and Chatham National Bank became the first national bank to operate branches in the same city with the main bank. In January 1915, there were negotiations for Chatham and Phenix National to buy and liquidate the Mutual Alliance Trust Company in its entirety. Chatham and Phenix Officers at the time included George M. Hard as chairman, Louis G. Kaufman as president, and three vice presidents. The merger was completed on January 14, 1915. The value of the merged institutions was $32,000,000. At the time, Kaufman was president of the Chatham, with Kaufman putting the deal through. In July 1915, the bank was in talks to potentially become a state institution. As of December 31, 1915, Chatham-Phenix was third in the United States for most profit earned on capital stock. By the end of 1916, the bank had deposits of about $86 million. At the time, Chatham and Phenix was "the only national branch which operates local branches, of which it has twelve," reported the Times. The bank moved into the Singer Building on December 30, 1916. On July 3, 1917, Chatham & Phenix National Bank and other institutions donated Red Cross dividends to the Red Cross War Finance Committee.

In January 1921, the Times reported that the Chatham and Phenix Nation Bank was "one of the few institutions in New York which enjoyed an increase in deposits during the year just ended." Also, the bank was one of the "few members of the Federal Reserve Bank which finished the year with no debt to that Bank, either bills payable or rediscounts." On November 7, 1921, Chatham and Phenix announced it had purchased New York County National Bank, to become a twelfth branch of the larger company. At the time, Chatham and Phenix had deposits of around $163,000,000. As of March 9, 1921, Chatham and Phenix National was one of four national banks in New York City operating branch offices, also including the Mechanics and Metals National, the Irving National, and National City Bank. Chatham and Phenix National Bank was one of 12 to support the Woodrow Wilson Foundation in January 1922, by accepting donations to establish an annual prize for "meritorious public service." As of March 10, 1922, deposits at the bank were $145,104,322, up from December 31, 1921, deposits of $141,741,371. In March total resources were placed at $176,614,626.

=== 1925-1931: Addition of Trust Co. of New York ===
Chatham Phenix National Bank and Trust Company of New York was organized in 1925 with resources of around $300,000,000 after it merged with Metropolitan Trust Company of New York, which had been founded in 1881. At the time of its formation, it was one of the ten largest banks in the United States.

On June 15, 1928, financier Louis L. Horch arranged for the American Bond and Mortgage Company to underwrite a bond of $1,925,000 to cover costs of the Master Apartments. The bonds were 6% Guaranteed Sinking Fund Gold Bond Certificates held under a trust mortgage with the Chatham Phenix National Bank and Trust Company. (Note: The tombstone ad for the issue said it consisted of a 6% first mortgage of 12-year sinking fund bond certificates denoted "Series A." They were dated June 15, 1928, and were to mature on June 15, 1940. The certificates were secured by a first mortgage of $2,075,000 of which $150,000 was designated as Series "B" and was subordinate to the bond issue. The corporate trustee was Chatham Phenix National Bank and Trust Co.) In 1929, Kaufman was made chairman of the Chatham Phenix Allied Corporation, an "investment concern of $50,000,000 capital."

=== 1932: Merger with Manufacturers Trust ===
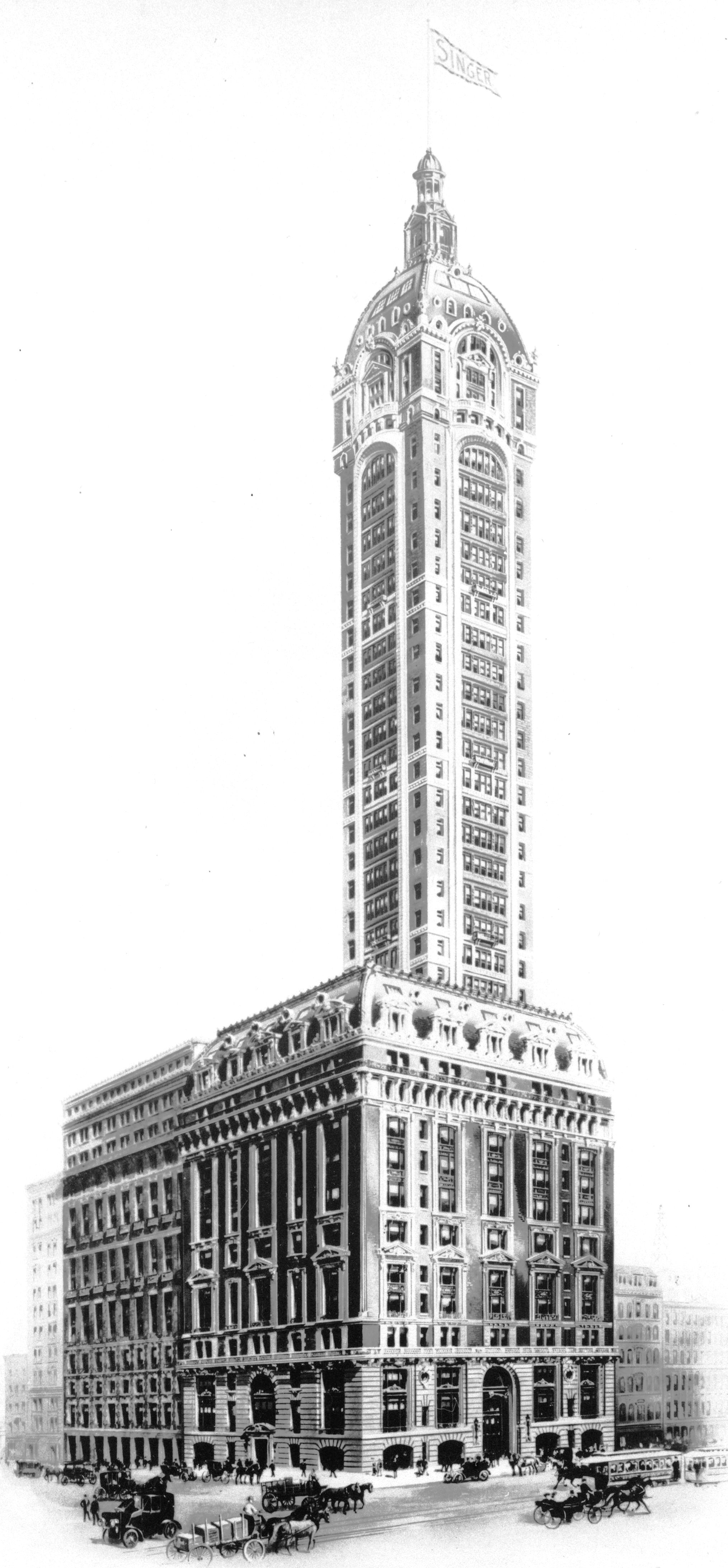
By 1921, Chatham and Phenix National Bank had its main office in the now-demolished Singer Building in Manhattan.

In 1932, the Chatham Phenix National Bank and Trust Company merged with the Manufacturers Trust, which had been formed in Brooklyn in 1914. Kaufman became chairman of the executive committee of the new organization, resigning the same year. By the time Kaufman retired in 1932, the bank had increased 50-fold in size from its formation in 1911. On March 21, 1934, Chatham-Phenix National Bank served as a trustee in the receivership of the American Fuel and Power Company. In May 1935, an employee won a judgement against the Chatham Phenix National Bank and Trust Company and the Chatham Phenix Corporation, after a stock sales offer Chatham Phenix National Bank and Trust Company made in August 1929 to its employees was deemed "sales talk."

In 1961, the Manufacturers Hanover Trust Company was formed through the merger of Manufacturers Trust and Hanover Bank. The New York Times wrote that "Manufacturers Trust had its beginnings in the Chatham Phenix National Bank and Trust Company... and the Manufacturers Trust Company, which was founded in Brooklyn in 1853 as the Manufacturers National Bank."

== Directors ==
As of early 1915, directors included Louis G. Kaufman, P. S. du Pont, August Belmont Jr., Edward Shearson, Edward E. Loomis, Elbert H. Garry, Frederick D. Underwood, John Ringling, and Daniel J. Carroll. The others at the time included Harden L. Crawford, Desmond Dunne, Ellis P. Earle, O. G. Fessenden, John H. Hansen, Horace E. Andrews, Frank J. Heaney, Parmely W. Herrick, Richard H. Higgins, H. Stuart Hotchkiss, William A. Law, Frank R. Lawrence, Waldo H. Marshall, Henry F. Shoemaker, Charles A. Starbuck, Sanford H. Steele, Albert A. Tilney, John D. Vermeule, and Samuel Weil.

== Buildings and branch locations ==
The original Chatham and Phenix building was at 192 Broadway in Manhattan. By 1916, the Chatham and Phenix National Bank had been headquartered at Broadway and John Street for close to fifty years. At the end of December 1916, the bank moved into the Singer Building, a floor-space increase of 20,000 to 26,000 square feet (1,900 to 2,400 m^{2}). The final move was made on December 30, 1916, out of the John Street building for several hundred employees and officers and into what the Times described as "one of the largest and finest banking rooms in the city," fitted at a cost of $300,000 into what the Times described as "offices with the most modern equipment."

By the end of 1916, the bank was "the only national branch which operates local branches, of which it has twelve," reported the Times. In 1917, the theater at 205 East 57th Street in Manhattan was remodeled by Chatham and Phenix National Bank and joined to the Third Avenue building. Finished in 1918, the new bank was designed by architects Mowbray & Uffinger, bank specialists who had also designed the 1908 Dime Savings Bank building. The building was turned back into a theater in 1933, after Chatham and Phenix Bank was acquired by the Manufacturers Trust Company the year prior. In November 1919, the bank signed a lease for the store and part of the basement at 434-438 Broadway, with the lease running until October 31, 1940. In April 1920, it was reported that the Bowery branch of the bank would move to a new $500,000 location at Bowery and Grand Street." In August 1921, the Times reported that Chatham and Phenix National Bank would pay "approximately $1,000,000 in rentals during the next forty-two years" for the corner store ad part of the basement of a new building at the "southwest corner of Seventh Avenue and Thirty-ninth Street."

The Chatham and Phenix Building was located at 67 West 125th Street. As of February 1922, the building was being used as well for meetings by organizations such as the Harlem Property Owners' Association. As of 1965, the Chatham-Phenix Building at 29-28 41 Avenue in Long Island City remained open to tenants.

== See also ==
- List of banks
- List of bank mergers in the United States
- Banking in the United States
- Economy of New York City
- List of banks in the Americas
- List of New York companies
