= William Carpender =

William Carpender (January 30, 1844 – November 25, 1927) was an American banker who served as president of the Sixth Avenue Railroad.

== Early life ==
Carpender was born in New York City on January 30, 1844. He was a son of merchant and banker Jacob Stout Carpender (1805–1882) and Catherine (née Neilson) Carpender (1807–1888). Among his sibling were Lucy Helena Carpender (wife of Rev. Dr. Charles Edward Hart), Mary Noel Carpender (wife of Francis Kerby Stevens, parents of Frances Noel Stevens Hall), John Neilson Carpender (father of Admiral Arthur S. Carpender), and Charles J. Carpender. For many years his father was secretary of the Atlantic Mutual Insurance Company.

His paternal grandparents were William Carpender and Lucy Weston (née Grant) Carpender. His uncle was Commodore Edward Weston Carpender. His maternal grandparents were Dr. John Neilson (son of Col. John Neilson) and Abigail (née Bleecker) Neilson (a daughter of merchant banker Anthony Lispenard Bleecker and sister to Anthony Bleecker).

== Career ==
Carpender was a member of the New York Stock Exchange, until his retirement in 1907, and served as president of the Sixth Avenue Railroad. He was also a director of the American Gas Company and of the Metropolitan Trust Company.

== Personal life ==
On November 26, 1878, Carpender was married to Ella Floyd-Jones (1852–1892), a daughter of William Floyd-Jones and Caroline (née Blackwell) Floyd-Jones. Her uncle was Lt.-Gov. David R. Floyd-Jones. Together, they lived at 4 East 49th Street and had a country home in Massapequa on Long Island and were the parents of one son and three daughters:

- Edith Carpender (1880–1952), who married Edward Henry Floyd-Jones, a son of New York State Senator Edward Floyd-Jones, in 1905.
- Noel Lispenard Carpender (1882–1926), a member of the New York Stock Exchange; he married Isabel Thacher Gourley, a daughter of John H. Gourley, in 1906.
- Jeannie Floyd-Jones Carpender (1887–1973), who married Philip Van Rensselaer Schuyler, a son of Frank D. Schuyler, in 1910.
- Ella Floyd-Jones Carpender (1892–1976), who married John Dulmage Carscallen II, son of Charles S. Carscallen, in 1919.

In 1917, Carpender married Alice Preble Tucker (1859–1920), a daughter of Edgar Tucker and Mary Agnes (née Preble) Tucker. Her brother, Preble Tucker, was the wife of Katherine Livingston Waldo (a half-sister of New York City Police and Fire Commissioner Rhinelander Waldo and a granddaughter of Morgan Lewis Livingston).

He was a member of the Union League Club for half a century and the New York Yacht Club. He was also a member of the Saint Nicholas Society and the Sons of the Revolution.

Carpender died at 996 Hillside Avenue, Plainfield, New Jersey, the home of his daughter, on November 25, 1927.
