= Francis M. Bacon =

American woolen manufacturer and banker

- Born: June 27, 1835; Dorchester, Boston, Massachusetts
- Died: September 21, 1912 (aged 77); Ridgefield, Connecticut
- Occupations: Woolen manufacturer and banker

Francis McNeil Bacon (June 27, 1835 – September 21, 1912) was an American woolen manufacturer and banker.

== Early life ==
Bacon was born on June 27, 1835, in Dorchester, Massachusetts. He was the eldest child of Lory Baldwin Bacon (1806–1877) and Sarah Ann (née Hammond) Bacon (1810–1886). Among his siblings were Sarah Walton Bacon and Louisa Fisher Bacon.

He was a grandson of Rufus Bacon of Sutton, who served with the Massachusetts militia during the Revolutionary War. His Bacon ancestors "came from England in the early 1600s, landed near Cape Cod, and settled in Worcester County, Mass."

Bacon was educated in public schools before graduating from Boston High School in 1853.

== Career ==
After graduating from Boston High School, he moved to New York City to "engage in the dry goods business." In 1860, he became a partner in the form of Hurlbert, Von Volkenburgh & Co., and a year later organized the firm of Francis M. Bacon & Co. The following year, because of ill health, he went to California. In 1873, he founded Haines, Bacon & Col, woolen commission merchants. In 1877, the firm became Bacon, Baldwin & Col, which continued after Baldwin's death in 1892 when it was renamed to Bacon & Co, and located at 92 Franklin Street in New York.

He was a trustee in the Atlantic Mutual Insurance Company and the Seamen's Bank for Savings and was a director in the Metropolitan Trust Company and the National City Bank of New York.

== Personal life ==
On November 24, 1862, Bacon was married to Margaret Rogers Gray (1839–1876), a daughter of Elizabeth Phillips (née Chapman) Gray and the Rev. Frederick Turell Gray of King's Chapel, Boston. Before her death in 1876, they were the parents of five children:

- Francis McNiel Bacon Jr. (b. 1864), who married Pauline Post.
- Margaret Gray Bacon (1866–1933), who Clinton Gilbert in 1899. They divorced in 1921.
- James Frederick Bacon (1867–1929), a Columbia graduate who married Alice (née Lee) Miller, a daughter of John Bowers Lee and former wife of Ralph G. Miller, in July 1912.
- Elizabeth Chapman Bacon (1870–1873), who died young.
- Rogers Hammond Bacon (1874–1962), an 1899 graduate of Harvard Law; he married Mabel (née Dean) Kalbfleisch, daughter of James Edward Dean and widow of Edward Kalbfleisch, in June 1912.

After her death, he married Katherine Paris Storrow (1842–1917) in October 1879. She was a daughter of Thomas Wentworth Storrow and Sarah Sanders (née Paris) Storrow and a grandniece of author Washington Irving. Her sister, Julie Grinnell Storrow, was the wife of Stephen Van Rensselaer Cruger. Together, they were the parents of one child:

- Wentworth Cruger Bacon (1880–1959), who served in France during World War I; he married actress Katherine La Salle Carpenter, daughter of Charles O. La Salle and former wife of Samuel Emlen Carpenter, in 1929. She had acted opposite John Barrymore in Master Mind.

He was a member of the Century Association, the Union Club, the Union League Club, the Players Club, the Merchants Club, the Church Club, and the Sons of the Revolution. In New York, their residence was at 20 West 10th Street.

After a "lingering illness", Bacon died on September 21, 1912, in Ridgefield, Connecticut. His funeral was held at the Episcopal Church of the Holy Communion on Sixth Avenue and 20th Street in Manhattan.

=== Descendants ===
Through his eldest son Francis, he was a grandfather of Francis McNeil Bacon III (who married photographer Antoinette Wood Frissell, sister of explorer Varick Frissell, in 1932), and Pauline Bacon (who married attorney Harold Edward Herrick in 1918).
