= Samuel McRoberts (United States Army officer) =

United States Army general

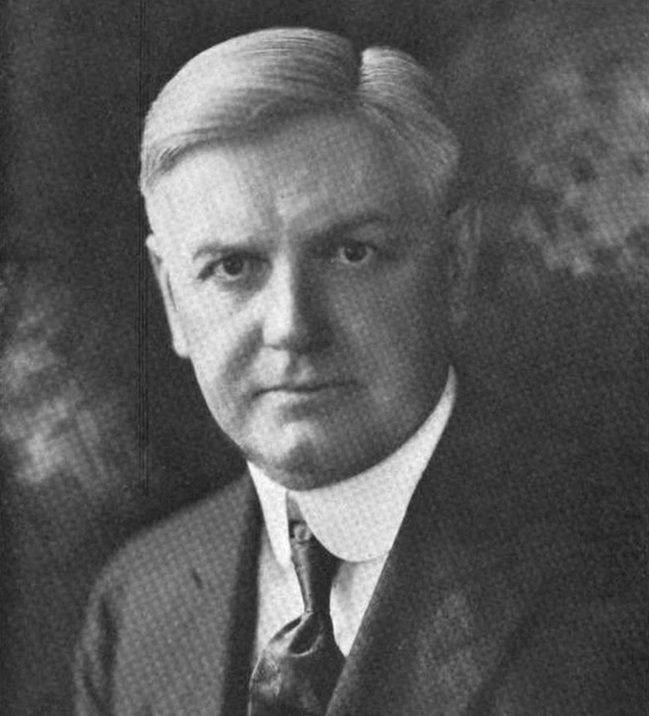
- From the January 1922 issue of Trust Companies magazine
- Born: December 20, 1868; Malta Bend, Missouri
- Died: September 8, 1947 (aged 78); New York City
- Burial place: Saint Matthew's Episcopal Churchyard, Bedford, New York
- Spouse(s): Mary Agnes Caldwell (married 1895, died 1904); Harriet Pearl Skinner (married 1906)
- Military career
- Allegiance: United States
- Branch: United States Army
- Service years: 1917–1938
- Rank: Major General
- Units: United States Army Ordnance Department; Officers Reserve Corps
- Conflicts: World War I
- Awards: Army Distinguished Service Medal; New York State Conspicuous Service Cross; Chevalier of the Legion of Honor
- Other work: Attorney; Businessman; President, Metropolitan Trust Company

Major General Samuel McRoberts (December 20, 1868 – September 8, 1947) was an American attorney, businessman, and U.S. Army officer. He was notable for his success as a manager with the Armour corporation, and an executive and board of directors member for numerous other corporations and banks. During World War I, he was commissioned as a major and promoted to brigadier general as one of several business leaders who were recruited to government and military service in order to provide guidance and advice on the acquisition and production of war materiel. McRoberts continued to serve in the Organized Reserve even after retiring from business in 1925, and provided input to the War Department on the equipping of the Army until retiring as a major general in 1938.

== Early life ==
Samuel McRoberts was born on December 20, 1868, in Malta Bend, Missouri, to Alexander Highlander McRoberts, a farmer, and Ellen (née Sisk) McRoberts. His grandparents were Alexander and Nancy (née Donnell) McRoberts, and his great-grandfather was Samuel McRoberts, who came to Virginia from Scotland during the American Revolutionary War. He attended Baker University, where he received an A.B. degree in 1891 and an M.A. in 1894. He graduated from the University of Michigan in 1893 with a bachelor of laws and was admitted to the bar.

== Career ==
McRoberts practiced law in Chicago, Illinois. From 1895 to 1900, he was an attorney for Armour and Company, and he later transferred to the financial department. His success as a manager and executive led to his appointment as treasurer of the company and general manager in 1904. While with Armour, he also served as president of the Illinois Tunnel Company for three years. McRoberts moved to New York City in 1909, and was vice president of the National City Bank in New York until his resignation in 1917.

=== Military career ===
In 1917, McRoberts was one of several prominent businessmen and corporate executives whose services were requested by the government because of their expertise in manufacturing, as well as other materiel production and management skills. McRoberts was initially commissioned as a major for service in the Ordnance Department in Washington, D.C. On November 28, 1917, he was promoted to colonel and assigned as Chief of the Procurement Division. On August 8, 1918, he was promoted to brigadier general and sent to France, where he served until the end of the war. During his military service, McRoberts provided advice and guidance on site selection for factories, as well as other management functions, including finance and budgeting, design of assembly lines, and production schedules.

McRoberts remained in uniform until receiving his discharge on January 15, 1919, and was then commissioned as a brigadier general in the Officers Reserve Corps. In recognition of his wartime contributions, McRoberts received the Distinguished Service Medal and the French Chevalier of the Legion of Honor. He remained in the active Reserve until 1938, and was frequently asked to provide advice and guidance to the United States Department of War on the production and fielding of military equipment.

=== Post-World War I ===
After the war, McRoberts resumed his business career. In 1922 he became president of the Metropolitan Trust Company, a position he held until retiring in 1925. In addition, he served on the board of directors of several financial institutions and other companies, including the American Sugar Refining Company and the Chicago, Milwaukee & St. Paul Railway.

McRoberts donated to many charitable causes, notably in obtaining settlement rights for a group of Canadian Mennonites in Paraguay. He published two books, 'The Extension of American Banking in Foreign Countries' in 1910 and 'Russia's Future Needs for Capital' in 1916. Baker University awarded him the honorary degree of LL.D. in 1919. McRoberts served as Chairman of The Economic Club of New York for the term 1930 to 1932.

== Personal life ==
On October 9, 1895, McRoberts married Mary Agnes Caldwell of Wichita, Kansas; she died in 1904. He married Harriet Pearl Skinner of Creston, Iowa, on September 1, 1906.

McRoberts died in New York City on September 8, 1947. He was buried at Saint Matthew's Episcopal Churchyard in Bedford, New York.
