= Walter E. Maynard =

American banker and investor

- c. 1918
- Born: Walter Effingham Maynard; November 17, 1871; New York City, New York, US
- Died: March 4, 1925 (aged 53); New York City, New York, US
- Education: Berkeley School; Harvard University
- Spouse: Eunice Ives (m. 1903)
- Children: Walter Maynard; Audrey Maynard Auchincloss
- Parent(s): Effingham Maynard; Helen Maria Hollister
- Relatives: Oliver Platt (great-grandson)
- Awards: Légion d'honneur

Walter Effingham Maynard (November 17, 1871 – March 4, 1925) was an American banker and real estate investor.

== Early life ==
At Harvard, c. 1893

Maynard was born in Manhattan on November 17, 1871. He was a son of New York publisher Effingham Maynard, of Effingham Maynard and Co., and Helen Maria (née Hollister) Maynard (1836–1916). His brother was Effingham Maynard Jr., who died unmarried.

His maternal grandparents were Gratia (née Buell) Hollister and Edwin M. Hollister, a New York City businessman, and his maternal aunt was Sarah Buell Hollister (the wife of Broughton Harris, Secretary of the Utah Territory).

Maynard was educated at the Berkeley School before attending Harvard University, from where he graduated in 1893.

== Career ==
Maynard served as president of the Dranyam Realty Corporation, and was a director of the Metropolitan Trust Company, the Detroit, Hillsdale and South Western Railroad.

An active participant in civic movements in New York City, he served as a trustee of the Beaux-Arts Institute of Design in New York, the New York Orthopedic Dispensary and Hospital, and the Fifth Avenue Association. He was made a Chevalier of the Légion d'honneur.

== Personal life ==
On April 19, 1903, Maynard was married to Eunice Ives (1872–1942), a daughter of Eleanor Anderson (née Bissell) Ives and Brayton Ives, who had served as President of the New York Stock Exchange, Northern Pacific Railway, and the Metropolitan Trust Company. Together, they were the parents of:

- Walter Maynard (1906–1971), an investment banker who married Eileen Burden (1911–1970), a daughter of Arthur Scott Burden and the Hon. Cynthia Burke Roche (her brother, Maurice Roche, 4th Baron Fermoy, was the maternal grandfather of Diana, Princess of Wales), in 1932. They later divorced and she married Thomas Robins in 1963.
- Audrey Maynard (1908–1996), who married John Winthrop Auchincloss (1912–1990), a brother of Louis Auchincloss, in 1941.

Maynard died at 114 East 40th Street, his residence in Manhattan, on March 4, 1925. His funeral was held at Grace Church. His widow lived in New York at 730 Park Avenue until her death on June 5, 1942.

=== Residences ===
In 1916, the Maynard estate in Brookville, New York known as Haut Bois was completed. The house was designed by Ogden Codman Jr. in the French style of Louis XIV's hunting lodge at the Palace of Versailles. Maynard was a Francophile and had known Codman for some time, the two of them collaborating to create the house. Jacques Greber designed the garden, reflecting pool and fountain.

=== Descendants ===
Through his son Walter, he was a grandfather of Sheila Maynard (1936–2018), a clinical social worker who worked in Islamabad, married Nicholas Platt, a career diplomat who served as U.S. ambassador to Pakistan, Zambia and the Philippines, in 1957, and had three sons: Adam Platt, a New York magazine restaurant critic, Oliver Platt (b. 1960), the actor, and Nicholas Platt Jr. Also through his son Walter, he was a grandfather to Walter Maynard Jr., an investment advisor with Morgan Stanley who married Pamela S. Silver in 1954 and was the father of John Maynard.
