= Parker Handy =

American banker (1809–1890)

Parker Handy (April 24, 1809 – April 8, 1890) was an American banker who was "one of the best known dealers in bullion and specie" in New York City.

== Early life ==
Handy was born in Paris Hill in Oneida County, New York on April 24, 1809. He was a son of Martha (née Parker) Handy (1764–1843) and William Truman Handy (1760–1823), who served in the Revolutionary War and was at the Battle of Germantown, Valley Forge and Monmouth. His elder sibling was William Porter Handy and his paternal grandfather was Jarius Handy, who was born in Connecticut but relocated to New York.

After receiving a common school education in New York, he went to work in a bank at Massillon, Ohio.

== Career ==
Handy served as a cashier through the "crisis of State banks and unstable banking business. His was one of the few banks which weathered the storm." He became an associate of Amasa Stone, with whom he established the Cleveland Stone Dressing Company. During the 1840s, he came to New York City to be cashier of the Ocean Bank at Greene and Fulton Streets, retiring before it later failed. After the Ocean Bank, he went "into the South American trade and carried on a prosperous business as senior member of the firm of Handy & Hoadley." In 1864, he became vice president of the Third National Bank and for many years was its acting president. He served as a director of the bank until eighteen months before his death.

In 1870, he succeeded Peter Hayden and established himself in the banking business, dealing primarily with bullion and specie, at 24 Nassau Street. In 1879, it was known as Handy & Cronice and remained so until 1885 when Cronice retired and J. F. Harman became partner and it was known as Handy & Harman. He ran the business until his death in 1890.

Handy was a founding trustee of the Metropolitan Trust Company in 1881, and served as a trustee of the Equitable Life Insurance Company, the American Fire Insurance Company and was a member of the New York Chamber of Commerce.

== Personal life ==
In 1835, Handy was married to Maria Sloane (1813–1843), a daughter of Maria (née Cogswell) Sloane (stepdaughter of Rev. Ebenezer Fitch) and Douglas Wheeler Sloane, a Williams College graduate who served in the War of 1812 and lived on Euclid Avenue in Cleveland, Ohio. Before her death in 1843, they were the parents of:

- Elizabeth Sloan Handy (1839–1911), who married Benjamin Ropes Dimon, brother of Charles A. R. Dimon. After his death in Mobile, Alabama during the Civil War, she married the Rev. William Halsey Van Dorn.
- Susan Maria Handy (1841–1914), who married Robert Bliss in 1861; they had eleven children including C. D. Bliss and Laurie Bliss.

After her death in 1843, he married her younger sister, Cornelia Kirkland Sloane (1827–1904), in 1845. Together, Cornelia and Parker were the parents of:

- Cortlandt Cogswell Handy (1849–1866), who died young.
- Parker Douglas Handy (1858–1929), chairman of the board of Handy & Harman, who married Annie Kissam Warner (1863–1934) in 1887.
- Cornelia Sloane Handy (1869–1949), who died unmarried.

He was an active Republican and was one of the founders of the Union League Club of New York and was a trustee of the Northern Dispensary as well as the Fifth Avenue Presbyterian Church.

Handy died on April 8, 1890, at his residence in Short Hills, New Jersey.
