= Julia Cruger =

American novelist

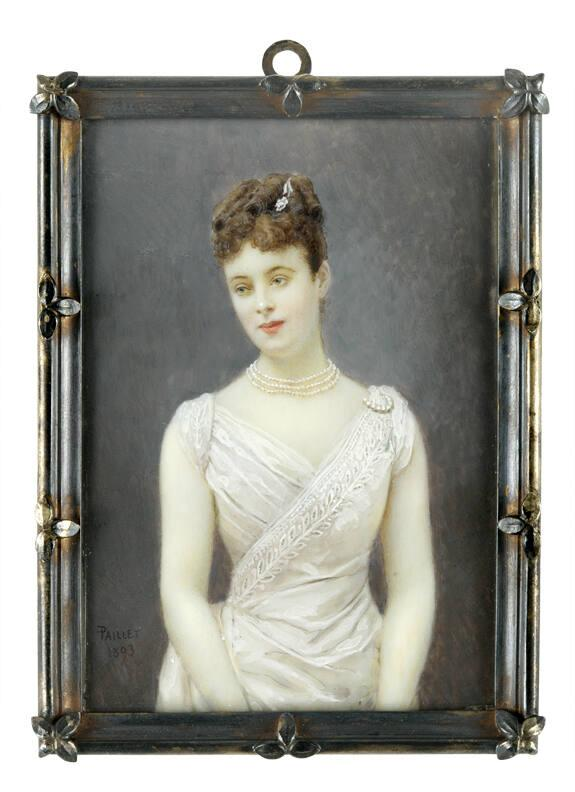
- Watercolor portrait of Mrs. S.V.R. Cruger by Fernand Paillet, 1893
- Born: Julia Grinnell Storrow; July 19, 1848; Paris, France
- Died: July 12, 1920 (aged 71); New York City
- Resting place: Sleepy Hollow Cemetery
- Occupation: Writer
- Spouse(s): Stephen Van Rensselaer Cruger (m. 1868; died 1898) Wade Chance (m. 1908; div. 1916)
- Parent: Thomas Wentworth Storrow
- Relatives: Washington Irving (grand-uncle)

Julia Grinnell Storrow Cruger (pseudonym: Julien Gordon; July 19, 1848 – July 12, 1920) was an American novelist. Because many of her books examined the American social world, she was known as the Edith Wharton of her day.

== Family ==
Julia Grinnell Storrow was born in Paris, France, in 1848. She was the daughter of Thomas Wentworth Storrow Jr. (1805–1861) of Boston and Sarah Sanders (née Paris) Storrow (1813–1885). Her elder sister, Katherine Paris Storrow, was the wife of banker Francis McNiel Bacon.

Her paternal grandparents were Thomas Wentworth Storrow and Sarah Phipps (née Brown) Storrow. His maternal grandparents were attorney John Daniel Paris and Catherine (née Irving) Paris, sister to Washington Irving (making Julia a grandniece of Washington Iriving).

== Career ==
In 1892, Cruger and her husband were included in Ward McAllister's "Four Hundred", purported to be an index of New York's best families, published in The New York Times. Conveniently, 400 was the number of people that could fit into Mrs. Astor's ballroom.

Her first book was A Diplomat's Diary (1890); it and the next three novels all appeared first in serial form. Many of her novels closely examined the social world of New York and Washington, D.C., and she was known as the Edith Wharton of her day.

== Personal life ==
On April 21, 1868, she married Col. Stephen Van Rensselaer Cruger in Trinity Chapel in New York City. A Civil War veteran, he was a grandson of Stephen Van Rensselaer. Following her husband's death in 1898, Julia inherited his fortune, leaving her independently well off.

On May 11, 1908, she married broker Wade Chance of Canton, Ohio, and London, who was fifteen years her junior, at her home in Washington, D.C. The couple, however, separated after a year, and were divorced in 1916. (Note: In 1915, her estranged husband Wade Chance, by then of New York, Newport, Pasadena, and London was said to be a friend of the Earl Kitchener.) Cruger, who spoke French fluently, then moved to Paris for several years living at 5 Rue du Général-Lambert and Avenue de Suffren, returning to New York not long before her death. As both of her daughters from her first marriage died young, her estate was inherited by her nephew, Wentworth Cruger Bacon.

== Selected works ==
- A Diplomat's Diary (1890)
- Vampires: Mademoiselle Réséda (1891)
- A Successful Man (1891)
- A Puritan Pagan (1891)
- Marionettes (1892)
- His Letters (1892)
- Poppaea (1895)
- A Wedding and Other Stories (1896)
- Eat Not Thy Heart (1897)
- Mrs. Clyde: The Story of a Social Career (1901)
- The Wage of Character: A Social Study (1901)
