= Thomas DeWitt Cuyler =

American lawyer (1854–1922)

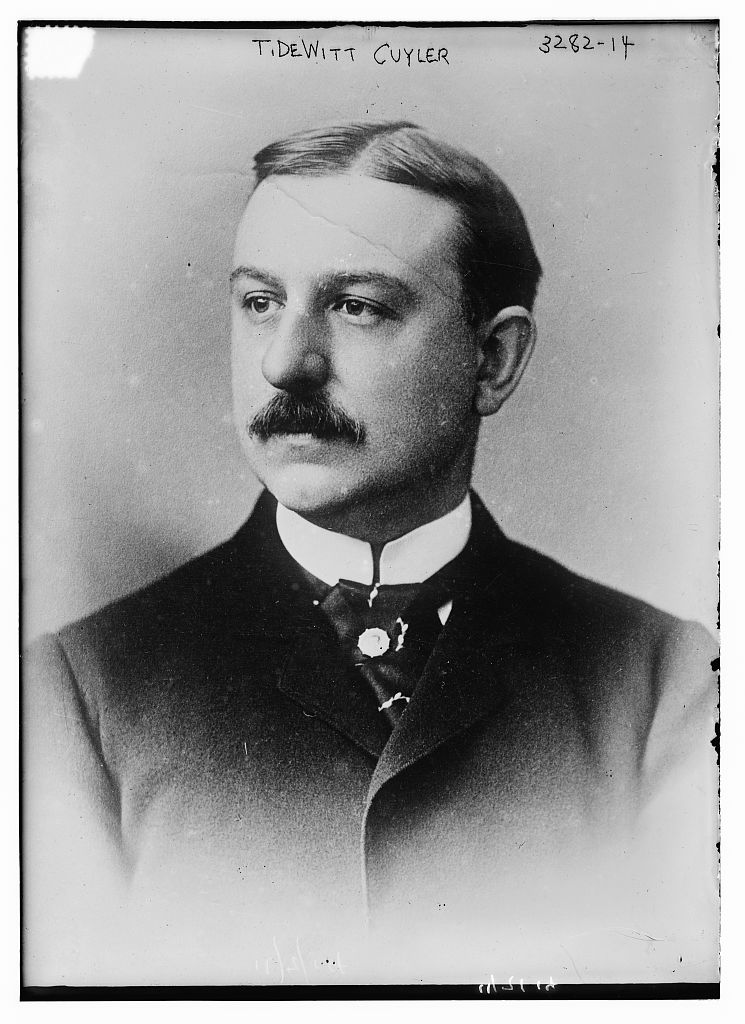
- Photograph of Cuyler, c. 1910
- Born: September 28, 1854; Philadelphia, Pennsylvania
- Died: November 2, 1922 (aged 68)
- Education: Yale University
- Occupation: Lawyer
- Spouse: Frances Lewis (m. 1881)
- Children: 4
- Parent(s): Theodore Cuyler; Mary Elizabeth DeWitt

Thomas DeWitt Cuyler (September 28, 1854 – November 2, 1922) was an American lawyer who served as director of the Pennsylvania Railroad and the chairman of the Association of Railway Executives.

== Early life ==
Cuyler was born in Philadelphia on September 28, 1854. He was the son of attorney Theodore Cuyler (1819–1876) and Mary Elizabeth (née DeWitt) Cuyler (1829–1892). He was named for his maternal grandfather, Rev. Thomas DeWitt Jr., who was the pastor of the Collegiate Dutch Church in New York City for forty years. His younger brother, Cornelius C. Cuyler, a Princeton graduate and banker, was named for their paternal grandfather, Cornelius C. Cuyler, and his sister, Eleanor DeGraff Cuyler, was named for their paternal grandmother, Eleanor (née DeGraff) Cuyler.

His maternal great-grandparents were Thomas DeWitt and Elsie (née Hasbrouck) DeWitt, a member of the prominent Hasbrouck family. Thomas DeWitt Sr.'s sister, Mary, married James Clinton and had New York Governor DeWitt Clinton, making him a first cousin, twice removed of Thomas DeWitt Cuyler. His maternal aunt, Maria van Antwerp DeWitt, was married to banker and philanthropist Morris Ketchum Jesup. He was directly descended from Hendrick Cuyler, who came from Amsterdam in the Netherlands in 1664, settling in Albany, New York.

After studying in the schools of Pennsylvania, Cuyler attended Yale University, from where he graduated in 1874. He studied law and was admitted to the bar in 1876.

== Career ==
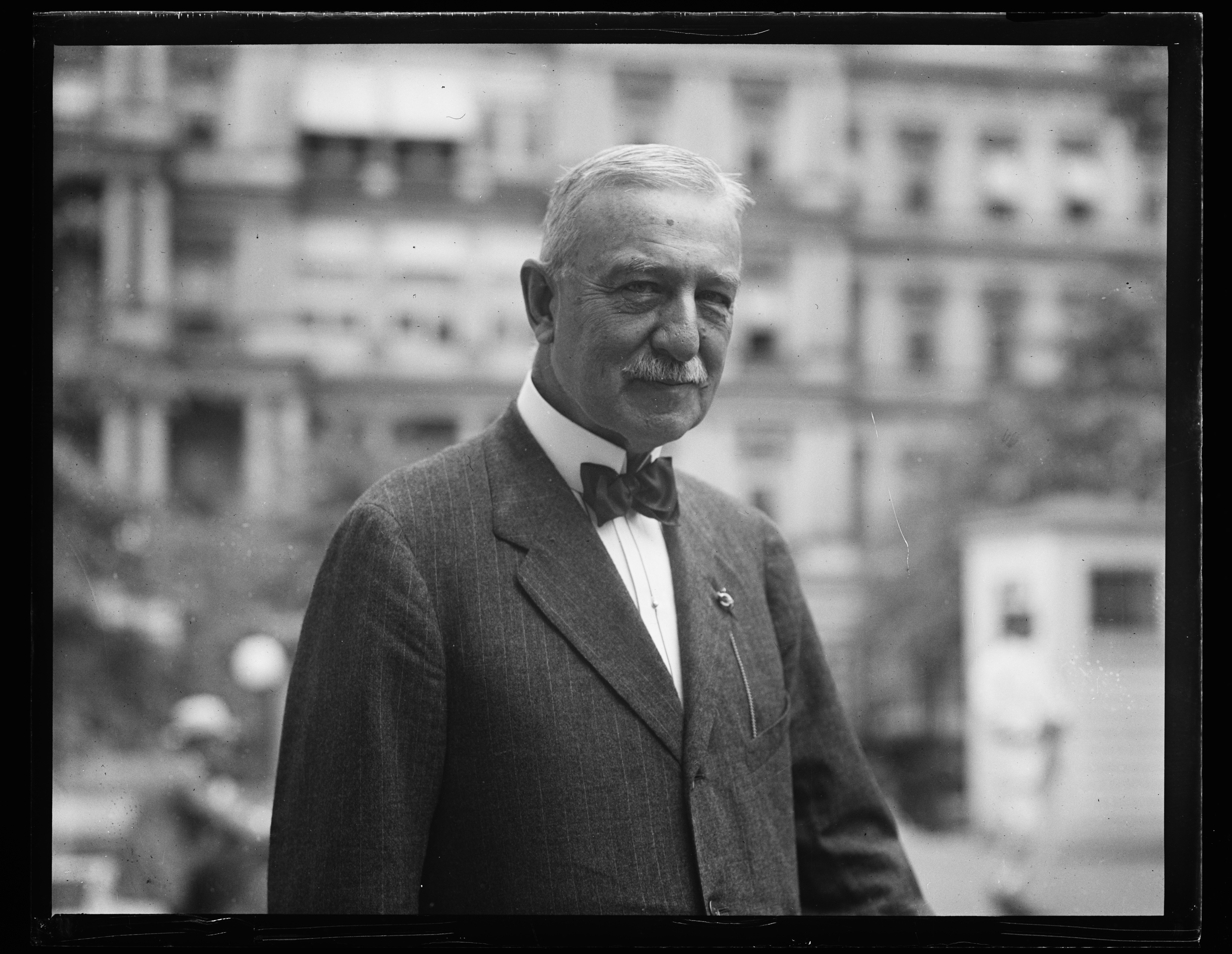
Cuyler at the White House in Washington, D.C., 1922

Cuyler started his career as counsel for "a number of Scottish and English development companies that brought settlers to the West to open up new territories. Much of his time was spent in Texas, California, New Mexico and other States, in which roads were being built and financed, and he became acquainted with the details of both operations." He later served as counsel in the reorganization of the Asphalt Company of America as "taking part in many of the most complicated and important railroad reorganization plans."

In May 1889, he was elected as a director of the Pennsylvania Railroad (of which his father had been general counsel). He was also a director of several railroads in the Pennsylvania system as well as of the Atchison, Topeka and Santa Fe Railway, the New York, New Haven and Hartford Railroad, the Rutland Railroad, the New York, Ontario and Western Railroad, the Maine Central Railroad, and the Long Island Railroad, the Interborough Rapid Transit Company, the Equitable Life Assurance Society, the Bankers Trust Company, the Western Union Telegraph Company, the Guaranty Trust Company, the Metropolitan Trust Company, the United States Mortgage and Trust Company, the Philadelphia Savings Fund Society, the Commercial Trust Company, among other railroads and corporations including hotel and real estate companies. Beginning on May 1, 1918, Cuyler succeeded Frank Trumbull as the chairman of the Association of Railway Executives.

== Personal life ==
On May 3, 1881, Cuyler married Frances Lewis (1860–1941) in Philadelphia. She was a daughter of John Thompson Lewis and Maria Litchfield (née Scott) Lewis. For many years, she was a member of the board of the Orphan Society of Philadelphia and served as president. Together, they were the parents of four daughters:

- Mary DeWitt Cuyler (1882–1968), who was named for her paternal grandmother; she died unmarried.
- Frances Lewis Cuyler (1883–1930), who was named for her mother; she died unmarried in Trouville, France.
- Helen Scott Cuyler (1887–1978), who married Caspar Wistar Morris (1880–1961), a son of Dr. Caspar Morris, in 1910.
- Eleanor DeGraff Cuyler (1898–1976); married first Joseph Walker III (1892–1981) in 1917. They divorced and she married U.S. diplomat Robert Strausz-Hupé in 1938.

Cuyler died of apoplexy in his private rail car on November 2, 1922. In his will, he left his widow $250,000 to his wife and $100,000 to each of his daughters, with the remainder of his estate going to his widow. His widow died at her home on Pembroke Avenue in Bryn Mawr, Pennsylvania in February 1941.

=== Legacy ===
There is the Thomas DeWitt Cuyler professorship in Economics and a DeWitt Cuyler Athletic Field, both at Yale University.
