= Haley Fiske =

American lawyer and insurance executive

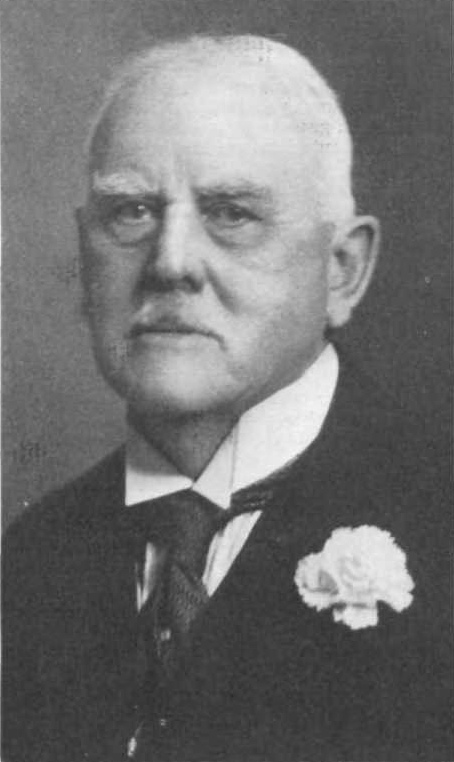

Haley Fiske (March 18, 1852 – March 3, 1929) was an American lawyer who served as president of the Metropolitan Life Insurance Company.

== Early life ==
Fiske was born on March 18, 1852, in New Brunswick, New Jersey. He was a son of William Henry Fiske and Sarah Ann (née Blakeney) Fiske. His namesake grandfather, Haley Fiske, had established an iron foundry in New Brunswick which his sons continued after the U.S. Civil War.

He was educated at privately by Henry Waters in New Brunswick before attending Rutgers College from where he graduated in 1871.

== Career ==
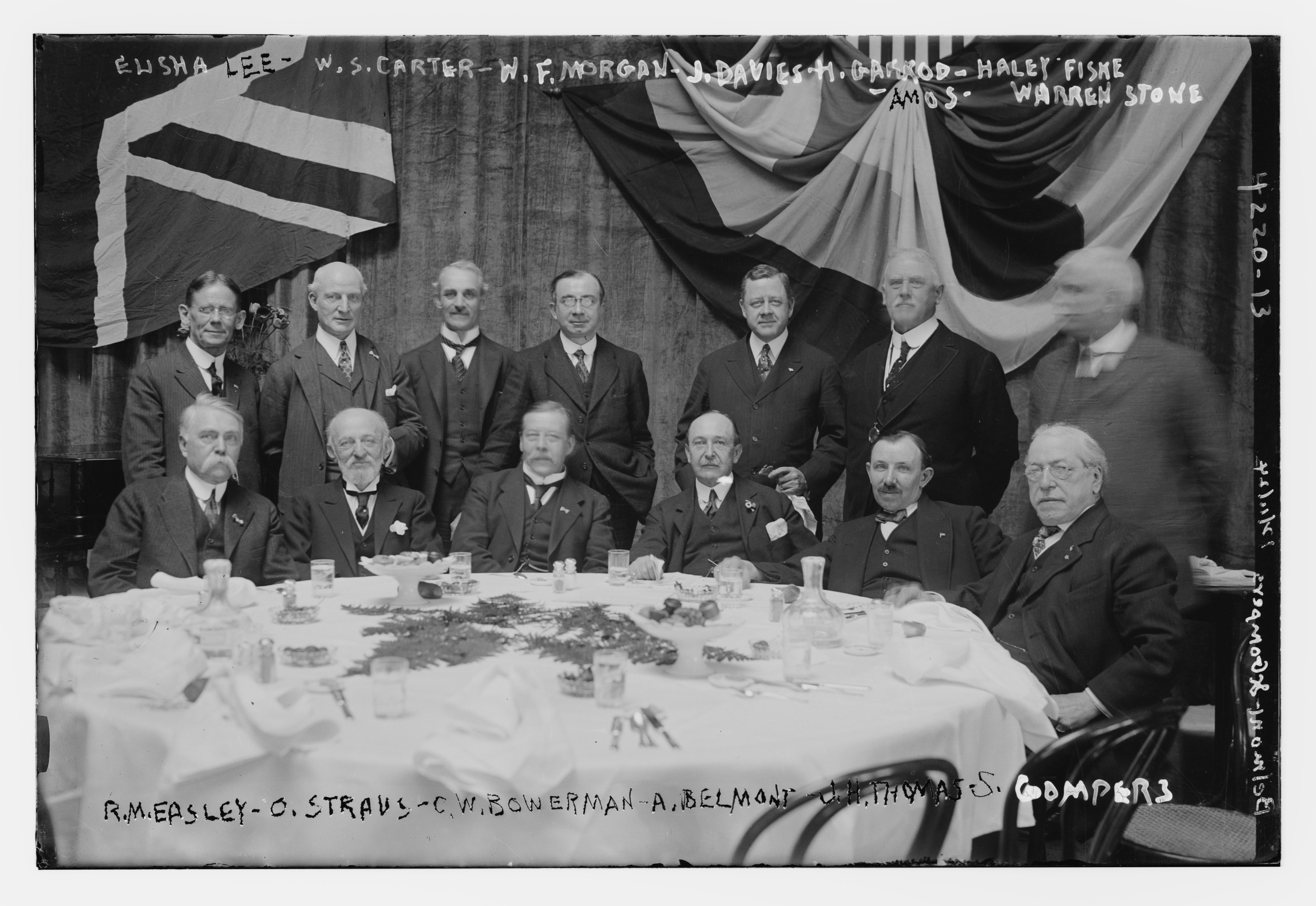
Elisha Lee, W.S. Carter, W.F. Morgan, J. Davies, H. Garrod, Haley Fiske, Amos, Warren Stone, R. M. Easley, O. Straus, C.W. Bowerman, A. Belmont, J.H. Thomas, S. Gompers

After his graduation from Rutgers, he worked as a reporter for local newspapers for two years before becoming a clerk in the New York law firm of Arnoux, Ritch & Woodford. The firm was counsel for the Metropolitan Life Insurance Company and, following his admission to the bar, he managed the company's litigation, eventually becoming a partner in the firm.

When John R. Hegeman became president of Metropolitan Life in 1891, he brought Fiske in as a vice president. After Hegeman died in 1919, Fiske was elected to succeed him as president of Metropolitan Life, which at the time was "the largest financial institution in the world."

== Personal life ==
On January 10, 1878, Fiske was married to Mary Garrettena Mulford (1856–1886). Before her death on February 3, 1886, they were the parents of:

- Helen Fiske (b. 1884)

After his first wife's death, he married Marione Cowles Cushman (1867–1946), the daughter of Archibald Falconer Cushman and Sarah Ann (née Cowles) Cushman, on April 27, 1887. Together, they had a home in Bernardsville, N.J. and New York City, were the parents of:

- Archibald Falconer Cushman Fiske (1888–1931)
- Marione Virginia Fiske, who married Kenneth Clark Johnson.
- Katherine Cushman Fiske, who married Emmons Parkman Burrill.
- Margaret Louise Fiske, who married John Speicher, and, later, Stalcoskie.
- Haley Fiske, Jr. (1897–1961), who married Helen Lowe Rice, a daughter of William Lowe Rice (founder of the law firm known today as Jones Day).

Fiske died in his automobile in front of his home at 898 Park Avenue after returning from Church on March 3, 1929. His entire estate was left to his widow and children. His widow died on December 31, 1946, at 10 Campden Road, her home in Scarsdale, New York.
