= Louis Graveraet Kaufman =

American businessman and banker

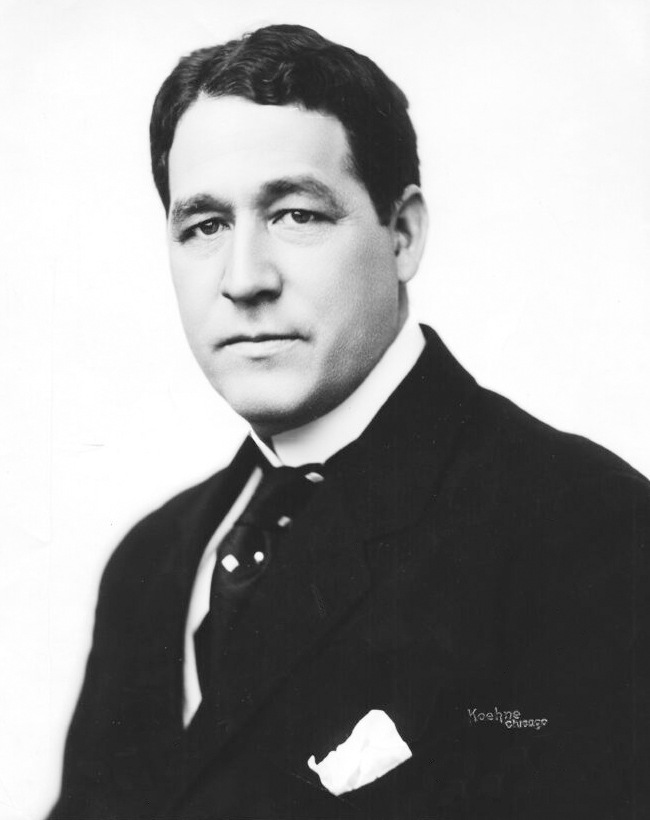
- Kaufman, c. 1910
- Born: November 13, 1870; Marquette, Michigan
- Died: March 10, 1942 (aged 71); West Palm Beach, Florida
- Occupations: President of First National Bank of Marquette, Chatham National Bank of New York, Chatham Phenix National Bank and Trust Company
- Board member of: General Motors
- Spouse: Marie Julia Young

Louis Graveraet Kaufman (November 13, 1870 – March 10, 1942) was an American business executive and businessman. He was named president of the First National Bank of Marquette in Marquette, Michigan, in 1906. In 1910, he became the president of Chatham National Bank of New York, while also remaining president of First National. Under Kaufman, Chatham National soon merged with Phenix National to form the Chatham Phenix National Bank and Trust Company. By the time Kaufman retired in 1932, the bank had increased 50-fold in size. After joining General Motors board of directors in 1910, Kaufman remained on GM's board for 22 years, and was chairman of their finance committee.

== Early life and career ==
He was born on November 13, 1870, in Marquette, Michigan, the son of Samuel Robert Kaufman and Juliet Adelaide Graveraet. Louis was educated in Marquette, and worked as a bookkeeper at the Iron Bay Manufacturing Company for two years. When he was 19, he became a messenger for the Marquette County Savings Bank. In 1898, he became the cashier-manager of that bank, and in 1901, became the vice president of Marquette's First National Bank. In 1906, he was named president of First National. By this time, Kaufman was associated with both the First National Bank and the Marquette County Savings Bank, and he was a director or officer for a number of other local mining, railroading, or insurance companies.

In 1910, he became the president of Chatham National Bank of New York, but only after receiving special dispensation allowing him to remain president of the First National Bank of Marquette. The bank soon merged with Phenix National to form the Chatham Phenix National Bank and Trust Company. This was the first of many mergers; by the time Kaufman retired in 1932, the bank had increased 50-fold in size.

In addition, Kaufman was elected to General Motors's board of directors in 1910. He had a major role in financing William C. Durant and his 1913 reorganization of Chevrolet and General Motors. Kaufman remained on GM's board for 22 years and was chairman of their finance committee.

== Personal life ==
In 1900, Kaufman married Marie Julia Young, daughter of Otto Young; the couple had five children. His daughter Joan married George Drexel Biddle, son of financier and tennis player Craig Biddle.

He built the estate Granot Loma.
