= Frederick Townsend Martin =

American writer and lawyer (1849–1914)

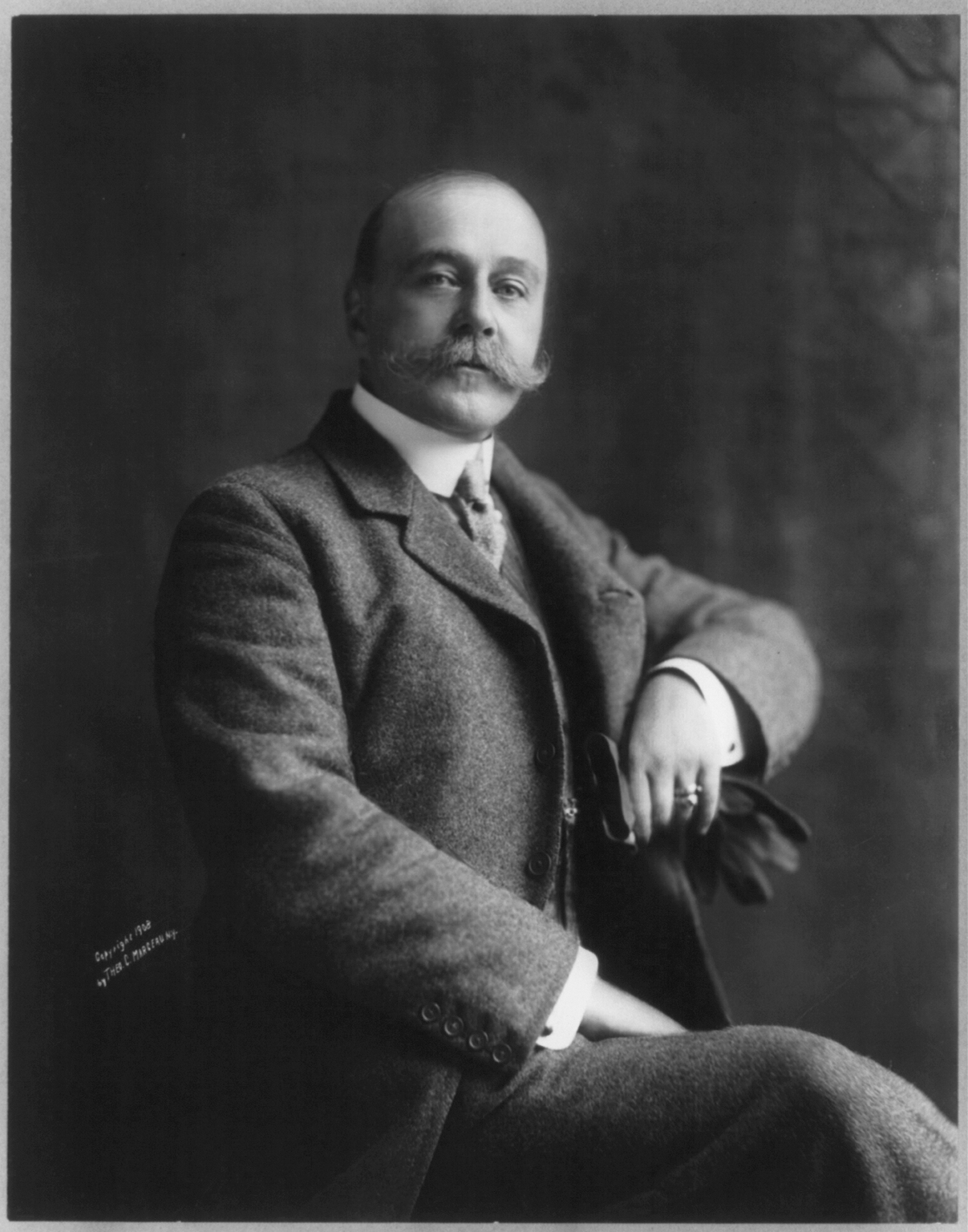
- Martin in 1908
- Born: 6 December 1849; Albany, New York
- Died: March 8, 1914 (aged 64); London, England
- Education: Albany Boys Academy
- Alma mater: Albany Law School
- Occupation: Writer
- Parent(s): Henry Hull Martin; Anna Townsend
- Relatives: Bradley Martin (brother)

Frederick Townsend Martin (December 6, 1849 – March 8, 1914) was an American writer, advocate for the poor, and an acknowledged leader of society in New York. He was referred to as a "millionaire with a mission".

== Early life ==
Martin was born in Albany, New York on December 6, 1849 to Henry Hull Martin (1809–1886) and Anna Townsend (1815–1866). His maternal grandfather was Solomon Townsend, a prominent merchant in Albany, and his siblings were Henry Townsend Martin (d. 1915), Bradley Martin (1841–1913), who married Cornelia Sherman, Howard Townsend Martin, and Alice Townsend. His niece, Bradley's daughter, Cornelia Martin (1877-1961), married William Craven, 4th Earl of Craven (1868–1921).

He was educated at the Albany Boys Academy and graduated from the Albany Law School in 1872 and served as a colonel in the New York National Guard, as judge advocate.

== Career ==
In 1911, he wrote The Passing of the Idle Rich. In that book, at the time of the election U.S. President Harrison, Martin, commenting on the power of American plutocrats to influence the political and economic status quo of the nation, wrote:

It matters not one iota what political party is in power or what President holds the reins of office. We are not politicians or public thinkers; we are the rich; we own America; we got it, God knows how, but we intend to keep it if we can by throwing all the tremendous weight of our support, our influence, our money, our political connections, our purchased Senators, our hungry Congressmen, our public-speaking demagogues into the scale against any legislature, any political platform, any presidential campaign that threatens the integrity of our estate.

Martin's writings often criticized the extravagances of the indolent or newly rich members of American Society and preached that "...where idleness and extravagance creep in decay begins. Nations as well as individuals have to be reminded of the dangers of these evils and they must be faced".

Martin would travel to the Bowery Mission in New York City to visit with the homeless. He also hosted an annual Christmas dinner for the homeless on the Lower East Side.

Martin received a large sum of money on the death of his brother, Bradley Martin. Martin was referred to as a successor to Ward McAllister and Harry Lehr as the leader of society in New York. Just prior to his death in 1914, he bought a 10-year lease of 6 Cumberland Place from Gowdy, to install an art collection bequeathed to him by his "intimate friend" Henry Sands. It was Sands intention that both of their collections be kept together and housed in London. After his death, his collection went to the Metropolitan Museum of Art in New York.

== Personal life ==
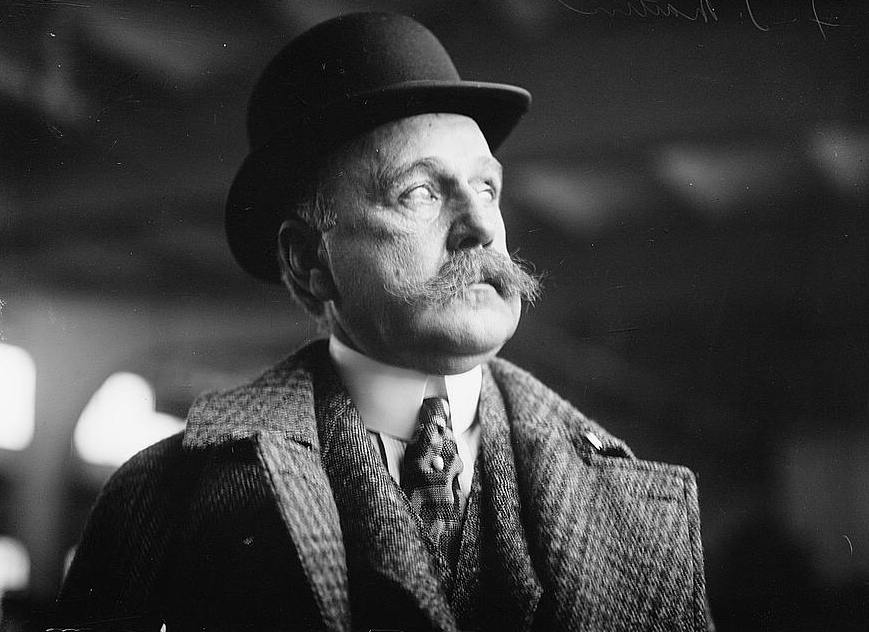
Frederick Townsend Martin, ca. 1910-1914

Martin, who did not marry, died on 8 March 1914 at the Hotel Berkeley in London, England of heart failure. His body was returned to America for burial. His funeral was held at Christ Church in London on March 11, 1914.

=== Clubs and organizations ===
Martin was a director of the Metropolitan Trust Company and was a member of a number of social clubs, including the Metropolitan Club, Knickerbocker Club, and Aero Club in New York, the Marlborough Club, St James's Club, Bachelors Club, and Wellington Club of London, the Travelers Club, Automobile Club, and Polo Club of Paris, and the Country Club of Puteaux France.

== Publications ==
- Martin, Frederick Townsend (1911). The Passing of the Idle Rich (PDF). Garden City, NY: Doubleday, Page and Company. ISBN 9780405069246.
- Martin, Frederick Townsend (1913). Things I Remember (PDF). London: E. Nash.
