= Orion H. Cheney =

American lawyer

Orion Howard Cheney
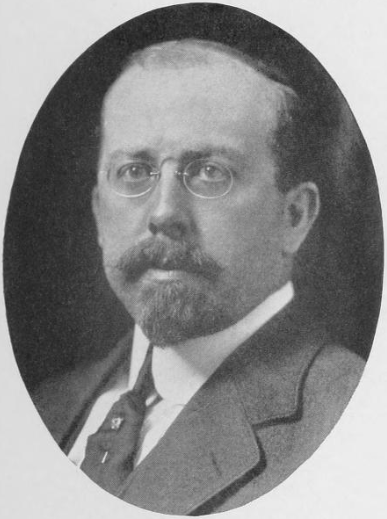
- Born: January 23, 1869; Bloomington, Illinois, U.S.
- Died: January 17, 1939 (aged 69); Patterson, New York, U.S.
- Education: New York University School of Law
- Occupation(s): Lawyer, banker

Orion Howard Cheney (January 23, 1869 – January 17, 1939) was an American lawyer and banker from New York.

== Life ==
Cheney was born on January 23, 1869, in Bloomington, Illinois, the son of Lewis H. Cheney and Mary Elizabeth West.

Cheney attended Drake University in Iowa and the University of Michigan. He moved to New York City in 1892, working at the Garfield National Bank until 1903. His uncle, Alfred C. Cheney, was the bank president. While working in the bank, he studied at New York University School of Law. He graduated from there in 1897 and was president of his class. He was admitted to the bar that year, and from 1903 to 1908 he was senior member of the law firm Cheney, Schenck & Stockell and made a specialty of banking law.

Cheney was a charter member of the New York branch of the American Institute of Banking. In May 1908, Superintendent of Banks Clark Williams appointed him Second Deputy Superintendent of Banking Department and in charge of the New York City office. In November 1909, after Williams was appointed New York State Comptroller, Governor Hughes appointed Cheney Superintendent of Banks. He held the office until May 1911. He then became president of the Pacific Bank, a position he held for the next fourteen years. After a merger he became vice president of the American Exchange-Pacific National Bank from 1925 to 1926. When the bank merged with the Irving Bank and Trust Company in October 1926, he became vice-president of the new bank. He largely retired from regular banking activities in 1930, although he occasionally returned to the banking field, including to help reorganize the Mount Vernon Trust Company in 1933.

Cheney moved to Scarsdale in around 1919. He then moved to Patterson in 1935. He was the vice-president and director of the Scarsdale National Bank and Trust Company from its organization in 1920 until his death, an officer of the Scarsdale Improvement Corporation and the Parkway, a member of the Scarsdale board of education from 1923 to 1930 as well as its president from 1924 to 1930, an organizer, president, and trustee of the Scarsdale Foundation from its founding in 1923 until 1935. He was also a director of the Guardian Life Insurance Company of America, and contributed articles to magazines like The Saturday Evening Post and Nation Business. In 1930, he wrote an exhaustive survey of the book industry at the invitation of publishers and booksellers. In 1928, he helped organize the Religious Education Foundation with Newton D. Baker, Russell Colgate, and James V. Penney. He served as president of the foundation from its founding until his death.

Cheney was a member of the Union League Club, the Manhattan Club, Phi Gamma Delta, Phi Delta Phi, the Economic Club of New York, the New York City Bar Association, and the New York State Bar Association. In 1909, he married Margaret Danforth. Their twin sons were Ward D. and Lewis W.

Cheney died at his home, Cornwall Hill Farm in Patterson, on January 17, 1939. He was buried in Ferncliff Mausoleum in Hartsdale.
