= Brayton Ives =

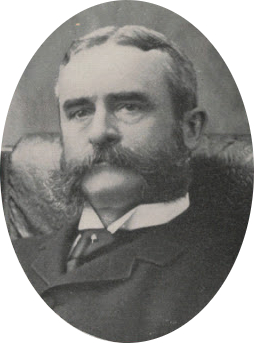

President of Northern Pacific Railway
- In office 1893–1896
- Preceded by: Thomas Fletcher Oakes
- Succeeded by: Edward Dean Adams

President of the New York Stock Exchange
- In office 1878–1880
- Preceded by: Henry Meigs Jr.
- Succeeded by: Donald Mackay

Personal details
- Born: August 23, 1840 Farmington, Connecticut
- Died: October 22, 1914 (aged 74) Ossining, New York
- Spouse: Eleanor Anderson Bissell (m. 1867)
- Education: Yale University

Military service
- Allegiance: United States of America; Union
- Branch/service: Union Army
- Years of service: 1861–1865
- Rank: Colonel; Bvt. Brigadier General
- Commands: 1st Connecticut Cavalry Regiment
- Battles/wars: American Civil War

Brayton Ives (August 23, 1840 – October 22, 1914) was president of Northern Pacific Railway from 1893 to 1896 and was president of the New York Stock Exchange and the Western National Bank of New York. He also served as an officer in the Union Army during the American Civil War.

== Early life ==
Ives was born on August 23, 1840, in Farmington, Connecticut. He was a son of William A. Ives and Julia (née Root).

He graduated from Yale University with a B.A. in 1861.

== Career ==
He served in the American Civil War as assistant adjutant general on the staff of Brigadier General Orris S. Ferry and became the Colonel of the 1st Connecticut Cavalry Regiment. He was brevetted brigadier general for gallantry at the battles of Ream's Station, Deep Bottom, Five Forks, and Sailor's Creek.

Ives became a prominent New York financier by 1868 and served two terms as president of the New York Stock Exchange; he was president of the Western National Bank of New York for many years and was chosen president of Northern Pacific Railway on 20 October 1893. At the time of his death he was President of the Hecker-Jones-Jewell Milling Company, the Standard Milling Company, the Kanona & Prattsburg Railway Company, and the Northwestern Consolidated Milling Company.

In 1912, he resigned as president of the Metropolitan Trust Company due to his poor health.

== Personal life ==
Ives was married to Eleanor Anderson Bissell (1840–1927), a sister of Rensselaer H. Bissell. on February 6, 1867. Together, they had four children:

- Sherwood Bissell Ives (1870–1907), who died of an accidental gunshot wound in New Mexico.
- Winifred Ives (1870–1918), an art collector who died unmarried.
- Eunice Ives (1872–1942), who married Walter Effingham Maynard (1871–1925).
- Frances Ives.

In 1899, they bought the former summer home of Benjamin Moore (father of Clement Clarke Moore), including a brick mansion, stables and riparian rights on the Hudson River for $80,000. Ives was a survivor of the sinking of the British ocean liner RMS Republic in January 1909.

He died in Ossining, New York, on October 22, 1914. His widow died in Bar Harbor, Maine, on August 31, 1927. She left her estate equally among her two surviving daughters. Among his descendants is actor Oliver Platt.

=== Collections ===
Ives was a collector of ceramics and other art objects, and of books. He had a library of more than 6000 volumes including many incunabula. He possessed a Gutenberg Bible, and early printed editions of Euclid and of the Iliad and the Odyssey. He had a collection of 200 rare books pertaining to the early settlement of America.

In addition to the ceramics and art, Ives made a collection of rare and historical swords. When he ceased collecting, the swords were sold, and through the efforts of Mr. Heber R. Bishop, William Thompson Walters and the American Art Association, the valuable sword collection, valued at $15,000, was donated to the Metropolitan Museum of Art.

Preceded by Thomas Fletcher Oakes	President of Northern Pacific Railway; 1893 – 1896	Succeeded by Edward Dean Adams
