= William Moore =

William Moore, and variations of William such as Will, Willie, Bill or Billy Moore, may refer to:

== Artists and entertainers ==
- Billy Moore (musician, born 1917) (1917–1989), American jazz musician
- Billy Moore (musician, born 1931) (1931–2002), Guyana Caribbean musician
- Wild Bill Moore (1918–1983), tenor saxophone player Expos
- William Moore (critic) (1868–1937), Australian art critic and author
- William Moore (musician) (1893–1951), American blues singer and guitarist
- William Moore (actor) (1916–2000), British TV actor
- William Moore (dancer) (1933–1992), African American dance critic, manager Eleo Pomare Dance Company
- William Henry Moore (politician) (1872–1960), Canadian author and member of the Canadian House of Commons
- William R. Moore (journalist) (1909/10–1950), war correspondent killed in the Korean War
- Willie "Pdub" Moore Jr. (born 1978), actor and comedian
- William Perry Moore III, American actor and musician
- William Moore (painter) (1790–1851), English portrait painter
- Bill Moore (painter) (1949–2020), American painter

== Businesspeople ==
- William Moore (banker) (1914–2009), chairman of the board, Bankers Trust
- William Dalgety Moore (1835–1910), Western Australian businessman
- William H. Moore, soldier, businessman and founder of the Mystic Copper Mine and Elizabethtown, New Mexico
- William H. H. Moore (1824–1910), American lawyer and insurance executive

== Military people ==
- William Moore (Medal of Honor) (1837–1918), American Civil War sailor and Medal of Honor recipient
- Bill Moore (British Army officer) (born 1958), British general
- William Moore (loyalist) (1949–2009), Northern Irish loyalist paramilitary and Shankill Butcher
- William G. Moore Jr. (1920–2012), U.S. Air Force general
- Sir William George Moore (British Army officer) (1795–1862)
- Sir William James Moore (1828–1896), surgeon-general and honorary physician to Queen Victoria

== Politicians and judges ==
- Bill Moore (Queensland politician) (1897–1976), member of the Queensland Legislative Assembly for Merthyr from 1940–1957
- William Moore (Ardee MP) (c. 1685–1732), member of the Parliament of Ireland for Ardee 1715–27
- William Moore (Clogher MP) (1743–1810), member of the Parliament of Ireland for Clogher, Clonmel and St Johnstown
- Sir William Moore, 1st Baronet (1864–1944), Irish politician and judge
- Sir William Moore, 2nd Baronet, Anglo-Irish politician
- William Robert Moore (1830–1909), American politician, U.S. representative from Tennessee
- William S. Moore (1822–1877), American lawyer and politician, U.S. congressman from Pennsylvania
- William S. Moore (Minnesota politician) (1830–1905), American lawyer and politician
- William J. Moore (1923–2015), American politician, Pennsylvania state senator 1973–1988
- Henson Moore (William Henson Moore III, born 1939), American lawyer and politician, U.S. representative from Louisiana
- William Moore (Banbury MP) (1699–1746), British politician, member of parliament for Banbury
- William Moore (1699–1783), US landowner, politician and jurist; builder of Moore Hall
- William Moore (Pennsylvania politician, died 1793) (c.1735–1793), jurist and politician, president (i.e. governor) of Pennsylvania
- William Moore (New Jersey politician) (1810–1878), American politician, U.S. representative from New Jersey
- William Campbell Moore (1923–1982), politician in British Columbia, Canada
- William Henry Moore (financier) (1848–1923), among founders, U.S. Steel, corporate director
- William A. Moore (North Carolina politician) (1831–1884), American lawyer, judge, confederate officer and politician
- William A. Moore (Illinois politician), member of the Illinois House of Representatives
- William L. Moore (Virginia politician) (1851–1926), American politician, member of the Virginia House of Delegates
- William O. Moore (1841–1913), American politician in the Virginia House of Delegates
- William Theodore Moore Jr. (born 1940), American lawyer, U.S. federal judge
- William T. Moore (Texas politician) (1918–1999), American politician, president pro tempore of the 55th Texas legislature
- William Moore (Wisconsin politician) (1886–1961), Wisconsin state assemblyman
- William Henry Moore (Australian solicitor) (1788–1854), English-Australian solicitor
- William Moore (Australian politician) (1823–1914), of both Tasmanian houses of parliament
- William Moore (Queensland politician) (1866–1933), of Queensland Legislative Assembly
- William Sturge Moore (died 1809), political figure in Lower Canada
- William Vail Moore (1818–?), Wisconsin state assemblyman
- William W. Moore (c. 1832–?), Florida representative
- William Hickman Moore (1861–1946), American politician in Seattle, Washington
- W. F. Moore (William Folsom Moore, 1868–1956), justice of the Supreme Court of Texas

== Sportspeople ==
=== Football ===
- Bill Moore (American football) (1912–1973)
- Bill Moore (Australian footballer) (1917–2009), Australian rules footballer
- Bill Moore (footballer, born 1913) (1913–1982), English football player and manager
- Bill Moore (rugby union) (1921–2002), English rugby union player
- Billy Moore (footballer, born 1894) (1894–1968), English footballer
- Billy Moore (footballer, born 1912) (1912–2002), Welsh footballer
- Billy Moore (rugby, born 1910) (1910–1976), Welsh dual-code rugby player
- Billy Moore (rugby league, born 1971) (born 1971), Australian rugby league footballer
- Will Moore (gridiron football) (born 1970), American and Canadian football wide receiver
- William Moore (American football) (born 1985), American football safety
- William Moore (footballer) (1895–1932), Ireland international footballer
- William M. Moore (1926–2013), American football and basketball coach
- William R. Moore (American football) (1922–2011), American football coach

=== Other sports ===
- Bill Moore (catcher) (1901–1972), MLB catcher for the 1926–27 Boston Red Sox
- Bill Moore (first baseman) (born 1960), MLB first baseman for the 1986 Montreal Expos
- Bill Moore (pitcher) (1902–1984), MLB pitcher for the 1925 Detroit Tigers
- Bill Moore (cricketer) (1863–1956), Australian cricketer
- Bill Moore (pole vaulter), winner of the 1946 and 1947 NCAA DI outdoor pole vault championship
- Billy Moore (boxer), English retired Muay Thai boxer
- Wilcy Moore (1897–1963), American baseball player
- William Moore (athlete) (1890–1956), British track and field athlete
- William Moore (cyclist) (born 1947), British Olympic cyclist
- William Moore (cricketer, born 1846) (1846–1919), English cricketer
- William Moore (bowls), Scottish lawn bowler
- William T. Moore (yachtsman), American yachtsman and president of Moore-McCormack, son of founder Albert V. Moore
- Willie Moore (Collegians hurler), Irish hurler and Gaelic footballer
- Willie Moore (Cork hurler) (1931–2003), Irish hurler for Cork
- Willie Moore (Limerick hurler) (born 1950), Irish hurler for Limerick
- William Moore (ice hockey) (born 2007), Canadian-American college ice hockey player
- William Moore (rugby union), Irish international rugby union player

== Other people ==
- Bill Moore (ufologist) (born 1943), author and UFO researcher
- Bill Moore, founder of the audio streaming service TuneIn
- William Moore (died 1697), gunner of William Kidd who was killed by Kidd
- William Moore (bishop) (1858–1930), Anglican bishop of Kilmore, Elphin and Ardagh
- William Moore (chemist) (1941–2020), American chemist
- William Moore (mathematician) (fl. c. 1806–1823), British contributor to rocket theory
- William Moore (steamship captain) (1822–1909), British Columbia gold rush entrepreneur and settler of Skagway, Alaska
- William Moore (surveyor) (1827–1897), Los Angeles County, California
- William C. Moore (born 1929), US Army general
- Will H. Moore (1962–2017), American political scientist
- William Harrison Moore (1867–1935), Australian lawyer and academic
- William Lewis Moore (1927–1963), American postal worker and Congress of Racial Equality (CORE) member
- William Samuel Moore (1830–1901), Australian headmaster and Anglican priest
- William Underhill Moore (1879–1949), American law professor
- William Usborne Moore (1849–1918), British naval commander, psychical researcher and spiritualist
- Willie Hobbs Moore (1934–1994), first African-American woman to earn a PhD in physics
- Willie Moretti (1894–1951), also known as Willie Moore, underboss of the Genovese crime family

== See also ==
- Billie Moore (1943–2022), American basketball coach
- William Moor (died 1765), British sailor and explorer with the Hudson's Bay Company
- William More (disambiguation)
