= William Henry Moore =

William Henry Moore may refer to:

- William Henry Moore (financier) (1848–1923), American attorney and financier
- William Henry Moore (politician) (1872–1960), Canadian lawyer, author and member of the Canadian House of Commons
- William Henry Moore (Australian solicitor) (c. 1788–1854), English-Australian solicitor
- William H. H. Moore (William Henry Helme Moore, 1824–1910), American lawyer and insurance executive
- William Moore (banker) (William Henry Moore II (1914–2009), American banker
- Bill Moore (cricketer) (William Henry Moore, 1863–1956), Australian cricketer
- Bill Moore (catcher) (William Henry Moore, 1901–1972), catcher in Major League Baseball

== See also ==
- William H. Moore (disambiguation)
- William Moore (disambiguation)
