= William H. Moore =

William H. Moore may refer to:

- William Henry Moore (financier) (1848–1923), American attorney and financier
- William Henry Moore (politician) (1872–1960), Canadian lawyer, author and member of the Canadian House of Commons
- William Henry Moore (Australian solicitor) (1788–1854), English-Australian solicitor
- William H. Moore (North Carolina politician), state legislator in North Carolina
- Henson Moore (William Henson Moore III, born 1939), former member of the U.S. House of Representatives

== See also ==
- William Moore (disambiguation)
