= Garling =

Garling is a surname. Notable people with the surname include:

- Frederick Garling (1775–1848), English-born Australian lawyer
- Frederick Garling Jr., (1806-1873) was an Australian government official and artist
- Henry Garling (1870–1942), Australian politician
- Jean Garling (1907–1998), Australian writer and dancer
- Peter Garling (born 1952), Australian judge
