= Parling =

Parling is a surname. Notable people with the surname include:

- Geoff Parling (born 1983), English rugby union coach and former player
- Sigge Parling (1930–2016), Swedish footballer

== See also ==
- List of populated places in the Tibet Autonomous Region#P
- Parlin (surname)
- Barling (surname), another surname
- Carling (surname), another surname
- Darling (surname), another surname
- Garling, another surname
