= Alexander Baxter =

Australian politician (1798–1834)

Member of the New South Wales Legislative Council
- In office 30 January 1829 – 24 January 1831

Attorney General of New South Wales
- In office 1 August 1827 – 24 January 1831
- Preceded by: William Moore (acting)
- Succeeded by: William Moore (acting)

Personal details
- Born: Alexander Macduff Baxter; 25 June 1798 Monzievaird, Perthshire, Scotland
- Died: 11 March 1834 (aged 35) Onchan, Isle of Man, British Isles
- Spouse: Maria del Rosaria Anna Uthair
- Children: 3
- Parents: Reverend Colin Baxter (father); Jacobina Baxter née Macduff (mother)
- Occupation: Barrister

Alexander Macduff Baxter (25 June 1798 – 11 March 1834) was a Scottish-Australian lawyer and politician who served as Attorney General of New South Wales between 1827 and 1831. The Governor of New South Wales, Sir Ralph Darling, considered him to be incompetent and tried to persuade the Colonial Office to dismiss him, but Baxter resigned in order to become a judge in Tasmania. In Tasmania, the Lieutenant-Governor, Sir George Arthur, managed to prevent Baxter from taking up his post. Baxter returned to England later in 1831 and died in 1834.

== Early life ==
Alexander Baxter was born at Monzievaird in Perthshire to the Reverend Colin Baxter and Jacobina Macduff in 1798. He was admitted as a barrister in London in 1819, but his career was unsuccessful and Baxter remained dependent on his father who sought help from Sir George Murray. Sir George was a Member of Parliament for Perthshire who would become Colonial Secretary in 1828. As a result, in 1826, Baxter was nominated as Attorney General of New South Wales.

== New South Wales and Tasmania ==
Just as in London, Baxter's legal career in Sydney was not a success. Within two months of taking up his post, the Governor, Sir Ralph Darling, wrote to the Colonial Office to complain that he was totally inexperienced and incapable of speaking effectively in court. Professionally incompetent, Baxter relied heavily on the new Solicitor General, William Foster and even sought help from other lawyers.

Alexander Baxter became a member of the New South Wales Legislative Council in 1829 but continued to fail to gain the Governor's confidence. The Governor and Chief Justice were sometimes required to draft legislation; work that should have been done by Baxter.

In 1831, Baxter resigned his post to take up the position of second judge on the Supreme Court of Tasmania. However, in Hobart, the Lieutenant-Governor was appalled by his behaviour and decided that it would have been "a violation of all public decency to have suffered him to take his seat on the Bench". Sir George Arthur agreed to a request for leave of absence from Baxter as a means of getting rid of him.

== Private life ==
In March 1827, shortly before leaving for New South Wales, Baxter married Maria del Rosario Anna Uthair, a Spanish heiress. Their son was born in Sydney on 24 August 1828. Baxter fell out with his wife over his lavish spending, which led to his bankruptcy. He became an alcoholic and attacked her violently after she gave birth to twin daughters. When she had the daughters baptised in the Roman Catholic faith, he left her, taking his young son with him, and Governor Darling helped Maria to return to England. As a widow, in 1836, she was still trying to recover jewels and other property that had been seized in Sydney to repay her husband's debts.

== Return to England ==
Baxter left Tasmania late in 1831. The following year he was imprisoned for debt for 12 months in Marshalsea prison. Baxter died at Onchan on the Isle of Man in 1834.

Political offices
Preceded by William Moore as acting	Attorney-General; 1827 – 1831	Succeeded by William Moore as acting
