= Cornelius Eldert =

American businessman and philanthropist

Cornelius Eldert (1850 – January 24, 1930) was an American businessman and philanthropist who served as president of the Atlantic Mutual Insurance Company.

== Early life ==
Eldert was born in 1850 in Brooklyn, New York and was a descendant of Dutch immigrants to New Amsterdam. He was a son of Samuel Eldert (1815–1870) and Aletta Ann (née Stoothoff) Eldert (1818–1898), and his brother was Ditmas Eldert. His maternal grandparents were Mary and John C. Stoothoff, and his paternal grandparents were Luke Eldert and Femmetye Phebe van Wicklen.

In his youth Eldert played baseball for the Crescent Base Ball Club of Jamaica, New York, and, in 1861, he had two of his fingers cut off by a straw cutter.

== Career ==
Beginning in 1865 at age sixteen, Eldert became associated with the Atlantic Mutual Insurance Company and spent the rest of his career there, focusing on marine insurance. The company, which had been founded in 1838 as the Atlantic Insurance Company as a joint-stock company, became a mutual company in 1842. He also served as president and director of the Board of Underwriters of New York, resigning the presidency a few years before his death. He became president in 1915, succeeding Anton A. Raven, and remained president until his death in 1930.

Eldert also served as trustee of the Seamen's Bank for Savings, vice president and director of the Atlantic Safe Deposit Company, and a director of the Underwriters Salvage Company and of the Metropolitan Trust Company.

== Personal life ==
Eldert was married to Isabelle Kate Cameron (1852–1935). Isabelle, who was born in British Guiana, was a daughter of Isabella Catherine (née Groves) Cameron and Donald Cameron. Her sister, Edith Cameron, was the wife of H. A. Graham Driscoll. Together, they lived at 557 First Street in Brooklyn and were the parents of:

- Katharine Stoothoff Eldert (1877–1976), who married the Rev. Joseph Percy Smyth, son of Irish immigrant Joseph P. Smyth, in 1905.
- Henry Cameron Eldert (1880–1937), a lawyer who married Marion Macmillin.

A prominent philanthropist and "generous supporter of diocesan and community charities," he was president of the Life Saving Benevolent Society from 1919 to 1930 and vice president of the Brooklyn Association for the Improvement of the Condition of the Poor.

Eldert died at his home in Brooklyn on January 24, 1930. After a funeral at St. Luke's Episcopal Church on Clinton Avenue in Brooklyn (where he had been a vestryman and warden), he was buried at Green-Wood Cemetery. His estate, which was valued at a net $1,750,913, was left to his family. His widow died in 1935.
