= Paul Moore Sr. =

American lawyer and businessman (1886–1959)

- Born: 1886; New Hampshire, United States
- Died: December 19, 1959 (aged 72–73); Morris Township, New Jersey
- Occupation: Businessman
- Known for: Founder of aircraft manufacturer, Republic Aviation
- Spouse: Fanny Mann Hanna (m. 1909)
- Children: 4 including Paul Moore Jr. and William Moore
- Father: William Henry "Judge" Moore

Paul Moore (1886 – December 19, 1959) was an American businessman and founder of Republic Aviation.

== Early life ==
Moore was born in 1886 and was the son of William Henry "Judge" Moore. He went to St. Paul's School in Concord, New Hampshire.

Moore attended Yale College, graduating with the class of 1908. After graduating from Yale, Moore started his career in the law office of the Rock Island Railroad in Chicago. He enrolled at Northwestern University School of Law while there but returned to New York and completed law studies at New York University School of Law, earning a law degree in 1911. During World War I he was a major with the United States Army Ordnance Corps in Washington.

== Career ==
Moore became a partner in the brokerage firm Taylor, Bates & Co. in New York City. He was a director of the Lehigh Valley Coal Sales Company.

Moore consolidated the gains made by his father during the "Great Merger Movement" at the turn of the 20th century. He reorganized Seversky Aircraft to form Republic Aviation in 1939 in Farmingdale, Long Island. He was a director and executive board member for Republic Aviation.

Moore sat on the boards of several enterprises put together by his father and uncle, James Hobart Moore, including United States Steel. He also was a director of the American Can Company, Bankers Trust, the National Biscuit Company, and the Delaware, Lackawanna and Western Railroad.

== Personal life ==
Moore married Fanny Mann Hanna on October 30, 1909, in Cleveland, Ohio. She was a daughter of Leonard C. Hanna Jr. and niece to Mark Hanna and was a member of the Citizens Committee for Planned Parenthood of the American Birth Control League. She was also the first female director of the Episcopal Church Foundation. They had two daughters and two sons. Their son, Paul Moore Jr., would go on to be the 13th Episcopal Bishop of the New York Diocese. Their son, William Moore was a banker and chairman Bankers Trust.

Moore hired architect Addison Mizner to build a 14,550 square feet (1,352 m^{2}) mansion at 1820 S. Ocean Blvd. in Palm Beach, Florida; it was completed in 1926.

He was a member of the Links Club, the Morris County Golf Club, and the Myopia Hunt Club.

Moore died on December 19, 1959, at his home in Convent Station, Morris Township, New Jersey.
