= Raven Glacier =

Glacier in Greenland

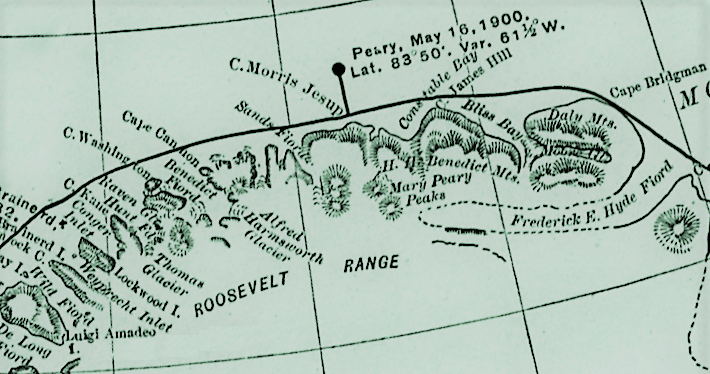
- Roosevelt Range section of Robert Peary's 1900 explorations map "Polar Regions".

- Location within Greenland
- Location: Greenland
- Coordinates: 83°27′N 38°55′W
- Width: 4 km (2.5 mi)
- Terminus: Hunt Fjord; Lincoln Sea

Raven Glacier is a glacier in northern Greenland. Administratively it belongs to the Northeast Greenland National Park.

The glacier was named by Robert Peary after Anton A. Raven, one of the founding members of the Peary Arctic Club in New York.

== Geography ==
The Raven Glacier is located at the northern end of Roosevelt Land. It flows roughly westwards to the south of Cape Washington. Its terminus lies on the eastern side of the mouth area of Hunt Fjord.

== See also ==
- List of glaciers in Greenland
- Peary Land
