= Cleveland E. Dodge Jr. =

American businessman (1922–2007)

Cleveland E. Dodge Jr. (March 7, 1922 – January 28, 2007) was an industrialist and businessman, and a pioneer of manufacturing temperature-resistant wire coatings using Teflon in the 1950s. He founded Dodge Fibers Corporation in 1955 to manufacture Teflon-coated fabrics. He later founded Dodge Machine Co., which manufactured Rope Grips and other products.

== Biography ==
After his father's death in 1982, Dodge became president of the Cleveland H. Dodge Foundation, established in 1917 by his grandfather Cleveland Hoadley Dodge. He developed an interest in the many New York City organizations which it helped fund. He served as director on boards including Phelps Dodge, Atlantic Mutual Insurance Company, the YMCA of New York, Springfield College, Key Bank, the Bennington Museum and the Thousand Islands Antique Boat Museum.

Cleveland Dodge was the great-grandson of William E. Dodge and cousin of David S. Dodge. He was born in New York, but lived much of his life in Pownal, Vermont, with his wife, Phyllis Boushall Dodge, and children Alice Dodge Berkeley, Sally Dodge Mole, and Andy Dodge.

== Legacy ==
Teachers College at Columbia University has an endowed professorship with the name of his father, Cleveland E. Dodge. Currently, John B. Black is the Cleveland E. Dodge Professor of Telecommunications and Education at Teachers College, Columbia University.
