= Crown Solicitor's Office (New South Wales) =

Statutory office of the New South Wales government lawyer

New South Wales Crown Solicitor's Office
Agency overview
- Formed: 1856
- Type: Executive agency
- Jurisdiction: New South Wales
- Headquarters: 60–70 Elizabeth Street, Sydney
- Agency executive: Karen Smith, NSW Crown Solicitor
- Parent Agency: Department of Communities and Justice
- Website: www.cso.nsw.gov.au

The New South Wales Crown Solicitor's Office (CSO) is an executive government agency of the New South Wales Department of Justice in Australia that has the role of providing legal services to the government, its agencies, and its statutory authorities. The Office practices in twelve areas of law, namely administrative law, child protection law, commercial law, community law, constitutional law, coronial law and inquiries, criminal law, employment law, government law, native title law, property law, and tort law. The Office frequently instructs barristers with regard to civil matters.

It was announced on 10 June 2015 that Lea Armstrong would be appointed as Crown Solicitor (to commence 13 July 2015); she became the first woman appointed to that role in New South Wales. Previously John McDonnell followed by Richard Kelly were the Acting Crown Solicitor following the departure of Ian Knight.

== History ==
In 1817, the position of Solicitor for the Crown, or Crown Solicitor, of the colony of New South Wales was created with the appointment of Thomas Wylde. In 1839, a Crown Solicitor for civil matters and another for criminal matters were appointed; but, in 1856, with introduction of responsible government, these roles were merged into that of a single New South Wales Crown Solicitor. In 1902, the first Australian-born New South Wales Crown Solicitor, John Varnell Tillett, was appointed to the position.

During the 1990s, the operations of the Crown Solicitor's Office were commercialised, and the Office was required to compete with the private legal profession for untied government legal work. In 1994, Ian Victor Knight, was appointed to the position; and, in 1996, he commenced a restructuring of the agency, converting its four branches into ten specialist practice groups.

== Functions ==
The Office provides legal services with regard to:

- matters that have implications for the Government of New South Wales beyond an individual Minister's portfolio;
- matters that involve the constitutional powers and privileges of the State of New South Wales and/or the Commonwealth of Australia;
- matters that raise issues which are fundamental to the responsibilities of Government; and,
- matters that arise from, or relate to, matters falling within the Attorney General's area of responsibility.

In addition to this, the Office competes with private legal firms and professionals to perform untied, general legal work for government agencies. Although it can act for individuals sued on behalf of the state, the Office cannot, however, provide legal services to the general public, which is the function of LawAccess NSW, per Section 110 of the Legal Profession Act 2004 (NSW).

== List of Crown Solicitors ==
Ordinal	Crown Solicitor	Term start	Term end	Time in office	Notes
1	Thomas Wylde	1817	1822	4–5 years	
2	William Moore (joint appointment)	1822	1827	4–5 years	
2	Frederick Garling (joint appointment) (Note: There is evidence that Garling may have served as a Crown Solicitor from 1816 or earlier. However, it is referenced that he was the second Crown Solicitor and served alongside Moore on the first occasion; and was not reappointed to the role when the office was re-established in 1829.)	1822	1827	4–5 years	
vacant		1827	1829	1–2 years	
(2)	William Moore	1829	1834	4–5 years	
3	David Chambers	1834	1835	0–1 years	
4	Francis Fisher	1835	1839	3–4 years	
5	John Moore Dillon (joint appointment)	1839	1859	19–20 years	
6	Francis Fisher (joint appointment)	1839	1839	0 years	
7	George Cooper Turner (joint appointment)	1839	1849	9–10 years	
8	William Whaley Billyard	1850	1859	8–9 years	
9	John Williams	1859	1891	32 years	
10	Ernest Augustus Smith	1891	1894	2–3 years	
11	George Colquhoun	1894	1901	6–7 years	
12	John Varnell Tillett	1902	1931	28–29 years	
13	John Ernest Clark	1931	1941	9–10 years	
14	Arthur Harry O'Connor	1941	1946	4–5 years	
15	Finlay Patrick McRae	1946	1961	14–15 years	
16	Raymond James McKay	1961	1976	14–15 years	
17	Hugh King Roberts	1976	1994	17–18 years	
18	Ian Victor Knight	1994	2015	20–21 years	
19	Lea Armstrong	2015	2019	3–4 years	
19	Karen Smith	2019	incumbent	7 years, 115 days	
