= Paul Moore Jr. =

American Episcopalian bishop (1919–2003)

The Right Reverend Paul Moore Jr
- Bishop of New York
- Church: Episcopal Church
- Diocese: New York
- In office: 1972–1989
- Predecessor: Horace W. B. Donegan
- Successor: Richard F. Grein
- Previous post: Coadjutor Bishop of New York (1969–1972)

Orders
- Ordination: December 17, 1949 by Benjamin M. Washburn
- Consecration: January 25, 1964 by Arthur C. Lichtenberger

Personal details
- Born: November 15, 1919 Morristown, New Jersey, United States
- Died: May 1, 2003 (aged 83) New York City, New York, United States
- Buried: Stonington Cemetery
- Denomination: Anglican
- Parents: Paul Moore Sr. & Fanny Weber Hanna
- Spouse: Jenny McKean (m. 1944; died 1973) Brenda Hughes Eagle (m. 1974; died 1999)
- Children: 9 (including Honor Moore)
- Education: Yale University
- Military career
- Allegiance: United States
- Branch: United States Marine Corps
- Service years: 1941-fl 1945
- Conflicts: World War II: Battle of Guadalcanal
- Awards: Navy Cross; Silver Star; Purple Heart

Paul Moore Jr. (November 15, 1919 – May 1, 2003) was a bishop of the Episcopal Church and former United States Marine Corps officer. He served as the 13th Bishop of New York from 1972 to 1989.

== Career ==
Paul Moore was a graduate of St. Paul's School and Yale University, where, like his father, he was a member of Wolf's Head Society. He had been president of the Berkeley Association, the Episcopal student group, and a Boy Scout leader at Yale.

He was a member of one of America's richest families. Moore was senior fellow on the Yale Corporation from the mid-1960s through the presidential administration of George H. W. Bush.

Moore joined the Marine Corps in 1941. He was a highly decorated Marine Corps captain, a veteran of the Guadalcanal Campaign during World War II earning the Navy Cross, a Silver Star and a Purple Heart. Returning home after the War, Moore was ordained in 1949 after graduating from the General Theological Seminary in New York City. Moore was named rector of Grace Church Van Vorst, an inner city parish in Jersey City, New Jersey, in the former township of Van Vorst, where he served from 1949 to 1957. There he began his career as a social activist, protesting inner city housing conditions and racial discrimination. He and his colleagues reinvigorated their inner city parish and were celebrated in the Church for their efforts.

In 1957, he was named as the dean of Christ Church Cathedral in Indianapolis, Indiana. Moore introduced the conservative Midwestern capital to social activism through his work in the inner city. Moore served in Indianapolis until he was elected Suffragan Bishop of Washington, D.C., in 1964.

During his time in Washington he became nationally known as an advocate of civil rights and an opponent of the Vietnam War. He knew Martin Luther King Jr., and marched with him in Selma and elsewhere. In 1970, he was elected as coadjutor and successor to Bishop Horace Donegan in New York City. He was installed as the bishop of the Diocese of New York in 1972 and held that position until 1989.

Throughout the 1970s, Moore oversaw the diocese's covert (and likely unwitting) support of the FALN, a terrorist group operating in the city in support of Puerto Rican independence. FALN members received tens of thousands of dollars from the diocese and were allowed to utilize church property, including a safehouse in Greenwich, Connecticut. When FBI agents began to investigate FALN's ties to the Episcopal Church, Moore directed legal resources to stymie the effort, denouncing the investigation as a ploy to prevent "the church from funding progressive Hispanic groups."

Moore was widely known for his liberal activism. Throughout his career he spoke out against homelessness and racism. He was an effective advocate of the interests of cities, once calling the corporations abandoning New York "rats leaving a sinking ship". He was the first Episcopal bishop to ordain an openly homosexual woman, Ellen Barrett as a priest in the church. In his book, Take a Bishop Like Me (1979), he defended his position by arguing that many priests were homosexuals but few had the courage to acknowledge it. His liberal political views were coupled with fierce traditionalism when it came to the liturgy and even the creed. In his writings and sermons he sometimes described himself as "born again", referring to his awakening to a fervent Christocentric faith as a boarding school student.

By birth, by inherited wealth, by friendships and career success, Moore was an acknowledged member of what was often called the "Liberal Establishment", a group that included Kingman Brewster and Cyrus Vance, along with many other graduates of Yale College. He wrote three books: The Church Reclaims the City (1965), Take a Bishop Like Me (1979), and, after his retirement, Presences: A Bishop's Life in the City (1997), a memoir.

== Personal life ==
In 1944, while in the Marine Corps, Moore married Jenny McKean a daughter of Bohemian privilege reared on the North Shore of Boston and educated at Madeira School, Vassar College and Barnard College. (Her mother was Margarett Sargent McKean, a noted painter in the Ashcan School and a follower of George Luks.) Together they had nine children (and, at his death, many grandchildren). Jenny McKean Moore published a well reviewed account of their decade together in the slums of Jersey City under the title The People on Second Street (1968). During that time the family lived in the tenement-like rectory of Grace van Vorst Church on Second Street in Jersey City (now called in his honor, Bishop Paul Moore Place).

Jenny McKean Moore died of colon cancer in 1973. Eighteen months later Moore married Brenda Hughes Eagle, a childless widow twenty two years his junior. She died of alcoholism in 1999. It was she who discovered his bisexual infidelity, around 1990, and made it known to his children, who kept the secret, as he had asked them to, until Honor Moore's revelations in 2008.

Honor Moore, the oldest of the Moore children and a bisexual, revealed that her father was himself bisexual with a history of affairs with men in a story she wrote about him in the March 3, 2008 issue of The New Yorker and in the book The Bishop's Daughter: A Memoir (W. W. Norton, 2008). In addition, she described a call she received six months after her father's death from a man, identified in the article by a pseudonym, who was the only person named in Moore's will who was unknown to the family. Honor Moore learned from the man that he had been her father's longtime lover and that they had traveled together to Patmos in Greece and elsewhere.

In 2018, Bishop Andrew Dietsche, Moore's successor at the helm of the Diocese of New York, released a pastoral letter describing the late Paul Moore Jr. as a "serial predator" who engaged in "long-time patterns" of sexual exploitation and abuse. One priest described himself as having been "one of Paul Moore's boys" when he was younger, and that the bishop's abuse "nearly ruined [his] life." Moore's daughter, Honor Moore, objected to the label of "sexual predator", arguing that he lived as a gay man in a period of "unfortunate boundaries."

== Awards and honors ==
In 1991 he received the Four Freedoms Award for the Freedom of Worship.

== External links and other sources ==
- Goldman, Ari L. (2 May 2003). "Episcopal Bishop Paul Moore Jr., 83, Dies; Strong Voice on Social and Political Issues". The New York Times.
- National Review article
- The New Yorker, Honor Moore

Episcopal Church (USA) titles
Preceded by Horace W. B. Donegan	Bishop of New York; 1972–1989	Succeeded by Richard F. Grein
