= William More =

William More may refer to:

- William More (died 1402), MP for the City of London
- William More (died 1434), MP for Cumberland (UK Parliament constituency)
- William More (bishop), Bishop of Colchester from 1536 until his death in 1541
- William More (prior); Prior of Worcester Cathedral until 1536
- William More (died 1549), MP for Shaftesbury
- William More (died 1600), MP for Reigate, Guildford, Grantham and Surrey
- William More (by 1511-68 or later), MP for Derby

== See also ==
- William Moore (disambiguation)
