= Eugene R. McGrath =

Eugene (Gene) R. McGrath (born 1942) in Yonkers, New York is an American businessman with extensive experience in engineering, operations, and executive management in the utility industry. McGrath was the Chairman of the Board and Chief Executive Officer of Consolidated Edison Company of New York, Inc., a regulated utility providing electric, gas, and steam service in New York City and Westchester County, New York. The company is a subsidiary of Consolidated Edison, Inc., the largest utility in one of the largest urban metropolitan areas in the world. A native New Yorker, McGrath spent his entire professional career with Con Edison. He has been listed as one of America's Most Powerful People in Forbes magazine.

== Consolidated Edison Company of New York, Inc. ==
In 1963, McGrath graduated from Manhattan College with a bachelor's degree in mechanical engineering. He accepted a position with Consolidated Edison Company of New York, Inc. directly upon graduation. He started his career as an engineer and management trainee in the operating and customer-service divisions.

McGrath excelled in his employment with Con Edison, moving into management, and becoming responsible for running fossil-fuel and nuclear power plants. He continued to move progressively into more responsible positions, eventually being elected to vice president of the company in 1978.

Continuing his education, McGrath received his Master of Business Administration (MBA) from Iona College in New York in 1980. The following year, he was promoted to senior vice president, and in 1982, executive vice president. In 1987, McGrath became one of the trustees of the company.

In 1989, he attended the six-week Advanced Management Program at Harvard University and was subsequently named the president and chief operating officer of the company. In September 1990, he accepted the position of chairman of the board and chief executive officer.

In April 2001, Consolidated Edison filed papers with the Securities and Exchange Commission stating that they had tripled the compensation of McGrath, to $9 million. Much of the increase was made up of restricted stock, valued at $6.2 million. This was a benefit that he had never received before. In addition to the stock, his salary was increased 9.1 percent to $1.03 million, with 67 percent bonus of $981,000. A statement included in the filing credited McGrath with several achievements, including "good financial and operating results, motivating the company's work force, and continued progress in achieving the goal of environmental excellence."

In September 2005, Kevin Burke assumed the roles of president and chief executive officer, while McGrath remained as chairman of the board.

=== Energy industry ===
Consolidated Edison Company of New York, Inc. is a subsidiary of the larger Consolidated Edison, Inc., supplying electric, natural gas, and steam-power services to New York City and Westchester County. Energy is delivered to more than four million customers through several distribution companies, including Consolidated Edison Company of New York, and Orange and Rockland Utilities. Both companies are subsidiaries of Consolidated Edison, Inc., delivering energy using the world's largest system of underground electric cables — some 94,000 miles — complemented by 36,000 miles of overhead electric wires.

In October 1997, McGrath was named president and chief executive officer of the parent company, Consolidated Edison, Inc. At that time, he also became a member and was elected chairman of the board of directors, a position that he held through February 2006.

Within the energy industry, McGrath served as the chairman of the Committee of the Energy Association of New York State. He also served on the board of directors of the Edison Electric Institute. In July 1999, McGrath began serving as chairman of the board of Orange and Rockland Utilities, a subsidiary of Consolidated Edison, Inc. He served in this capacity until September 2005. Since 2005, McGrath has served as a director of Associated Electric and Gas Insurance Services Limited.

=== Current membership ===
Since 2005, McGrath has served as a director of GAMCO Investors, Inc.; Sensus (Bermuda 2) Ltd. and Sensus USA Inc. He is also an administrative trustee of both Barnard College and Manhattan College, as well as the American Museum of Natural History.

McGrath is chairman of the Union Square Partnership and a member of the board of directors of the American Woman's Economic Development Corporation, the Business Council of New York State, and the Partnership for New York City, as well as a director of AEGIS Insurance Services, Atlantic Mutual Insurance Company, the Fresh Air Fund, the Hudson River Foundation for Science and Environmental Research, Inc., the Wildlife Conservation Society, and a member of the Mayor's Fund to Advance New York City.

=== Past memberships ===
McGrath was a member of the Committee to Encourage Corporate Philanthropy, the Council on Foreign Relations, the Economic Club of New York, the Development Advisory Council for the Lower Manhattan Development Corporation, the National Academy of Engineering, and the New York City Public/Private Initiatives. He was also a member of the Energy Committee of the New York Building Congress. He served as director of Schering-Plough Corporation through November 2009.

== Leadership awards ==
- Leaders in Management Award, Pace University, 1997
- Honorary Doctorate of Commercial Science, Pace University, 1997
