= Telepossession =

In law, telepossession is the right of ownership of a resource based on telepresence rather than physical proximity. The term gained importance in maritime salvage following the case of the SS Central America. In the case of the SS Central America, the Columbus-American Discovery Group Inc. won over the insurer, Atlantic Mutual Insurance Company. This case was decided in the 4th Circuit Court of Appeals in 1992.

The basis for a claim of telepossession was the operation of robotic workers at the submerged site, where they performed the tasks of salvage workers. These telepossession robots worked to secure the site, provide for the management of the site, retrieve the gold from the shipwreck and other tasks. The common law principle of pedis possessio was relied on by the claimants to press their claim for ownership of the recovered gold. Pedis possesseo in layman's terms means "To walk on and to claim possession". This principle is the basis of the 1862 Homestead Act and the General Mining Act of 1872 of the Congress of the United States, which opened up the western United States for colonization and growth.

Under the 1967 Moon Treaty of the United Nations, all property must be developed to the benefit of all humanity. Telepossession can provide for a form of possession which will allow mining and space colonization companies from all the world's nations, as private entities, to develop the extraterrestrial resources used in making space stations, fleets of spacecraft, fueling stations, asteroid threat control, infrastructure and all other colonization infrastructures. See United Nations Treaties regarding space and Space Policy.

== See also ==
- General Mining Act of 1872
- Outer Space Treaty
