= Jean Garling =

Australian writer and dancer

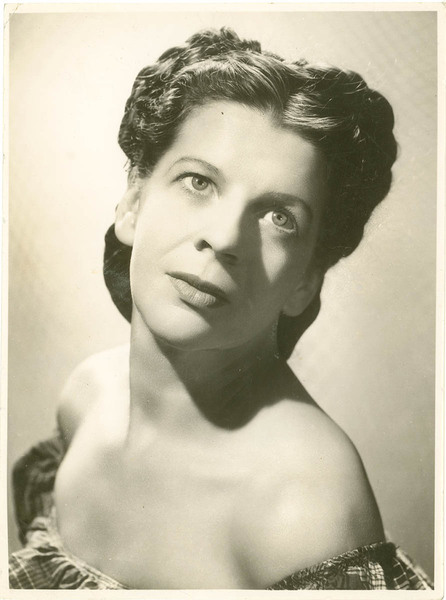
Jean Garling

Jean Garling (1907–1998) was an Australian writer, dancer, and for many years a strong supporter of dance and the performing arts, in Sydney, New South Wales. She was a founding member of the Library Society, and became a Governor Benefactor of the State Library of New South Wales in 1992, subsequently bequeathing her whole estate to the Library upon her death in 1998.

== Early life ==
Garling was born on 3 September 1907 in Gilgandra, New South Wales. She was a descendant of Frederick Garling, who arrived in Sydney in 1815 as one of the two Crown solicitors for the Colony. She was educated at Gulargambone Public School and, for a short time, at Dubbo High School, before moving to Sydney, where she attended Shirley (Ailanthus College) before finishing her secondary education at the Sydney Church of England Grammar School for Girls (SCEGGS), Darlinghurst.

Garling studied physiotherapy at the University of Sydney, and received a Diploma of Massage in 1927. She worked initially as a masseuse at Royal Prince Alfred Hospital before serving as a physiotherapist in the Australian Army Medical Women's Service in Darwin during 1941 – 1942, holding the rank of Lieutenant. As a civilian Garling subsequently worked at the Repatriation General Hospital, Concord and at Sydney Hospital.

She worked a backstage manager for Sydney Eisteddfod and Musica Viva, and in 1947 she wrote and starred in her own play, entitled The Jokers.

Garling was classically trained in ballet, and danced with the Lightfoot-Burlakov First Australian Ballet, where she was taught by Mischa Burlakov, who came to Australia with Anna Pavlova.

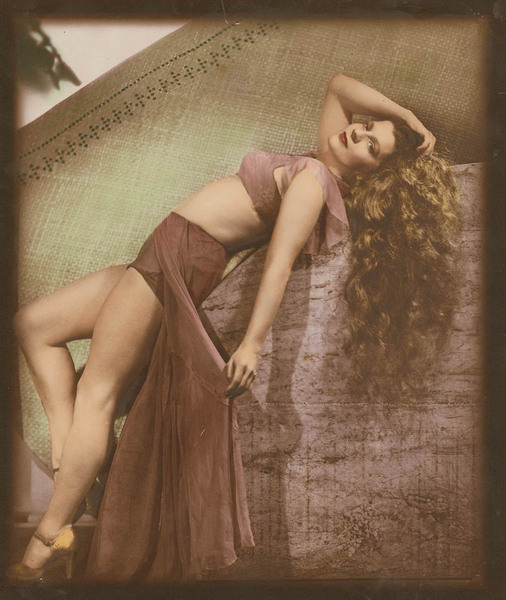
Jean Garling (1943)

== Publications ==
Jean Garling was the author of Australian Notes on the Ballet (ASIN B001C8FCLG), which was published in 1950 with the subtitle "highlights of Ballet in Australia showing contemporary trend and influences up to the present world premiere of the Australian ballet Corroboree".

== Death ==
Jean Garling died on 8 April 1998 aged 90. She is buried in the Gilgandra General Cemetery.
