= Atlantic Mutual Insurance Company =

Defunct American mutual insurance company

- Formerly: Atlantic Insurance Company
- Industry: mutual insurance company
- Founded: 1838
- Headquarters: 140 Broadway, New York
- Area served: United States
- Key people: Walter Restored Jones (first chairman, 1842); John Divine Jones (president, 1874); E. Virgil Conway; Cleveland E. Dodge Jr. William E. Dodge Jr. Eugene R. McGrath
- Services: personal insurance marine insurance commercial property insurance casualty insurance

The Atlantic Mutual Insurance Company was a mutual insurance company which offers personal, marine, commercial property, and casualty insurance. It is part of the Atlantic Mutual Companies, which includes Centennial Insurance Company. Its corporate headquarters are at 140 Broadway, a block from the World Trade Center.

== History ==
The company was founded in 1838 as the Atlantic Insurance Company. Originally a joint-stock company, it became a mutual company on April 11, 1842. Its first chairman was Walter Restored Jones, a member of a prominent upper-class family of attorneys in New York City. The Jones family ran the company for decades.

By the 1850s, Atlantic Mutual was the largest marine and general insurance firm in North America and the only marine insurance firm in New York state. During the 1850s, it made exceedingly high profits. In 1852, the company began keeping a clipping service of newspaper accounts of shipwrecks and sinkings known as Vessel Disasters, a work which became famous as the best source of information on maritime disasters in the North Atlantic. During the Civil War, Atlantic Mutual was the primary insurer of most Union shipping.

In 1874, Atlantic Mutual President John Divine Jones provided the money which established the permanent foundation of the New York Historical Society. William H. H. Moore served as president from 1895 to 1897, when he was succeeded by Anton A. Raven. In 1915, after sixty-three years with the company, Anton A. Raven retired as president and was succeeded by Cornelius Eldert, formerly vice president. Eldert served as president until his death in 1930. Following Eldert's death in 1930, Walter Wood Parsons was elected to the presidency in February 1930. In 1934, William D. Winter was elected president to succeed Parsons.

In 1946, J. Arthur Bogardus was elected president with Winter, becoming chairman of the board. Upon Franklin B. Tuttle's elevation to the presidency in February 1951, Bogardus became chairman. Upon Bogardus' retirement in 1953, Tuttle was elevated to board chairman and Miles F. York became the new president of the Atlantic Mutual and Centennial Insurance Companies. York retired as chairman of the board in 1969. Atlantic Mutual built the existing building at 45 Wall Street in 1959, which served as the company's headquarters until the mid-1970s. Vacant and deteriorating for more than 20 years, it was sold in 1996 and converted to apartments.

Atlantic Mutual was involved in a significant tax law case which reached the U.S. Supreme Court in the 1990s. The Tax Reform Act of 1986 altered the formula under which insurance companies could deduct additions to their financial reserves. The Internal Revenue Service (IRS) determined that Atlantic Mutual had strengthened its reserves, but the company countered that it had merely engaged in a computational change. In a unanimous decision, the Supreme Court upheld the IRS' interpretation of the law.

After the construction of the World Trade Center, Atlantic Mutual moved its headquarters from 45 Wall Street to 140 Broadway. The company was one of many which insured buildings in and around the World Trade Center, and the firm suffered significant losses after the September 11 attacks. Since Atlantic Mutual was more than 100 years old, the company was a member of The Hundred Year Association of New York.

=== Decline and liquidation ===
In 1995, Atlantic Mutual sold its data center facility in Roanoke, Virginia to MFX Roanoke, Inc. In 2003, the company sold the renewal rights to its commercial overland Marine and Ocean Going Cargo business to Travelers, and its Specialty Lines business to OneBeacon Insurance. In 2004, the company "scaled down its operations to focus solely on personal lines business, particularly in the high net worth market." After a downgrade by A.M. Best in 2006, the company also sold its "high net worth personal lines business to Ace Group" in 2007.

In 2010, New York state insurance regulators revoked Atlantic Mutual's insurance licenses and placed it into rehabilitation because it had a negative capital and surplus of $25.1 million. On April 27, 2011, the Supreme Court of the State of New York, County of New York, declared that Atlantic Mutual and Centennial Insurance Company were insolvent, and placed them in liquidation after the company was swamped with workers' compensation insurance claims. James J. Wrynn, the Superintendent of Insurance of the State of New York was appointed liquidator.

== Famous shipwrecks insured by Atlantic Mutual ==
As the largest marine insurance firm in the United States for many years, Atlantic Mutual became involved in some of the most famous shipwrecks in American history.

- SS Central America - The company insured the SS Central America, a sidewheel steamship laden with gold which sank in a hurricane in September 1857. When the wreck was rediscovered by the Columbus-American Discovery Group, Inc. on September 11, 1987, Atlantic Mutual and 38 other insurance companies filed suit against the treasure-hunting firm, claiming that because they paid damages for the lost gold they had the right to it. In a precedent-setting court case on telepossession, the 4th Circuit Court of Appeals ruled against Atlantic Mutual and the other insurance companies and awarded 92 percent of the gold to the Columbus-American Group.
- Mary Celeste - Atlantic Mutual was also one of the insurers of the Mary Celeste, an American brigantine sailing out of Staten Island, New York. In December 1872, a month after leaving Staten Island for Italy, the ship was seen adrift and without her crew and no explanation for the "ghost ship" has ever successfully explained why the ship was abandoned. Atlantic Mutual established a small museum dedicated to the mystery of the Mary Celeste at its corporate headquarters, which included a model of the ship and the captain's lap desk.
- RMS Titanic - The Atlantic Mutual Insurance Company also helped to insure the RMS Titanic. The ship was insured for $140,000, of which $100,000 was held by Atlantic Mutual. The largest passenger steamship in the world at the time, the Titanic struck an iceberg on the night of April 14, 1912, during her maiden voyage and sank with more than 1,500 people still aboard two hours and forty minutes later.

== Notable presidents, chairman and directors of the Atlantic Mutual ==
The Atlantic Mutual Insurance Co. has been led by a number of prominent New Yorkers as well as leading American business people. Among them are:

Presidents

- 1895–1897: William H. H. Moore
- 1897–1915: Anton A. Raven
- 1915–1930: Cornelius Eldert
- 1930–1934: Walter Wood Parsons
- 1934–1946: William D. Winter
- 1946–1951: J. Arthur Bogardus
- 1951–1953: Franklin B. Tuttle
- 1953–1966: Miles F. York
- 1966–1969: David A. Floreen
- 1970–1976: Harold A. Eckmann
- 1976–1985: John J. Mackowski
- 1985–1988: Edward K. Trowbridge
- 1988–1995: Kenneth J. Gorman
- 1995–1997: Klaus G. Dorfi
- 1997–2004: Kermit C. Smith
- 2004–2008: Daniel H. Olmsted

Directors

- E. Virgil Conway
- Cleveland E. Dodge Jr.
- William E. Dodge Jr.
- Eugene R. McGrath

== See also ==
- List of oldest companies
- Early skyscrapers
