= William R. Moore (journalist) =

American journalist

William R. Moore (1909 or 1910 – July 30 or July 31, 1950) was an American war correspondent for the Associated Press who was the 90th reporter killed while covering the Korean War. He was one of the first reporters to reach the front lines, and the first to report on North Korean war crimes such as executing captured prisoners.

Moore worked for The Oklahoman until 1937, when he was first hired by the AP. After that he served as an Army Major in Korea in 1946, until he once again returned to AP in 1948 to cover the war.

He was killed on either July 30 or July 31, 1950, after he advised tank commander Lieutenant Samuel R. Fowler to check out a platoon-sized group of approaching North Koreans in Masan, and the resulting firefight left both men among the dead.
