= Anton A. Raven =

Curaçaoan-born American business executive

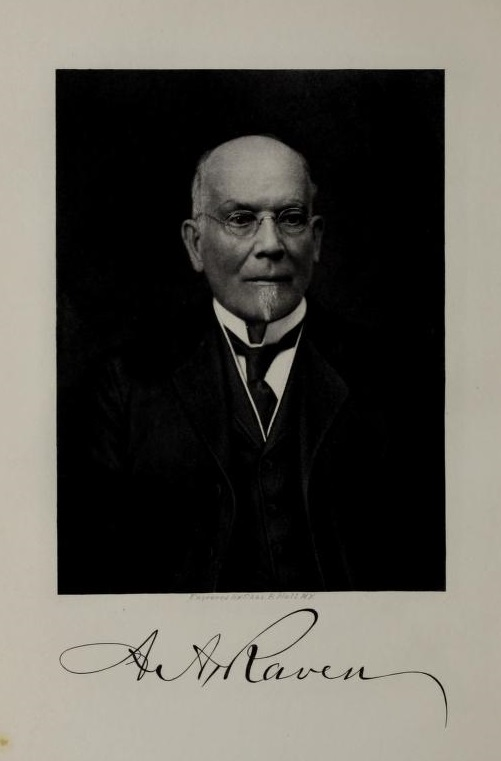
Anton Adolph Raven, American banker

Anton Adolph Raven (September 30, 1833 – January 15, 1919) was a Curaçaoan-born American business executive.

== Early life ==
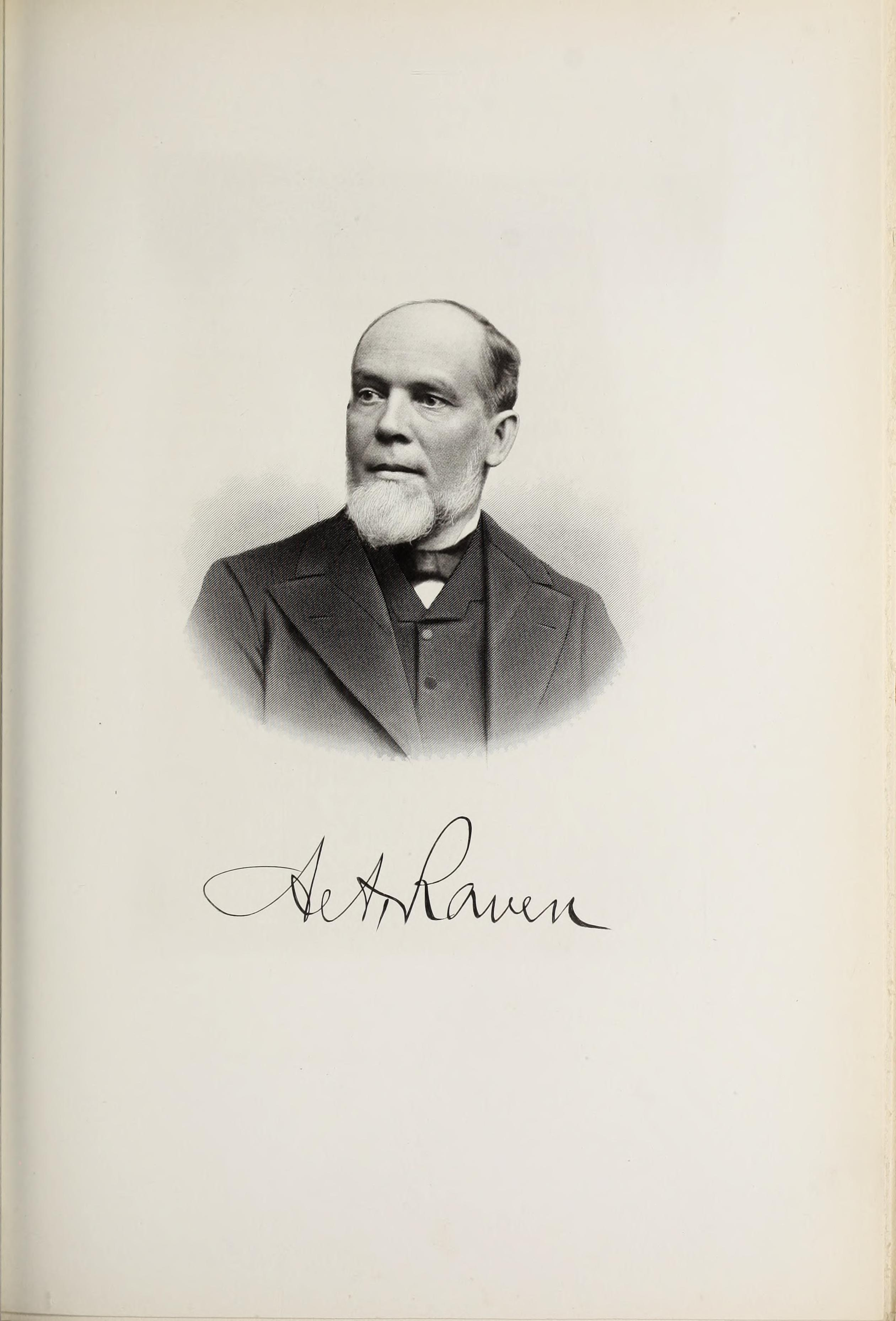
Raven, 1900

Raven was born on September 30, 1833, in Curaçao in what was then a part of the Dutch West Indies. He was a son of John Rudolf Raven, a merchant in the "Spanish-American Republic of Venezuela", and Petronella (née Hutchings) Raven, who came from "ancestors who came from Holland to New York State and thence removed to Curaçao, West Indies where she herself was born."

After receiving his education in St. Thomas, he came to New York at the age of seventeen in 1850.

== Career ==
On January 4, 1852, Raven joined the Atlantic Mutual Insurance Company as a clerk. Atlantic had been founded as a joint-stock company in 1838 as the Atlantic Insurance Company before becoming a mutual company in 1842. He was appointed an underwriter in 1865, fourth vice-president in 1874, third vice president in 1876, and second vice president in 1886. He was elected vice president in 1895 and elected president two years later in 1895. Raven retired as president in 1915 and was succeeded by Cornelius Eldert, formerly vice president.

He also served as a director of the Metropolitan Trust Company, the Atlantic Trust Company, the Home Life Insurance Company and the Phenix National Bank of New York.

== Personal life ==
In 1860, Raven was married to Cleveland born Gertrude Oatman (1840–1914), a daughter of James C. Oatman. Together, they were the parents of five children:

- Henry Hutchings Raven (1861–1862), who died young.
- William Oatman Raven (d. 1940), who married Angeline Odell in 1899.
- Caroline Elizabeth Raven, who married Peter A. MacLean. After his death, she married Charles Strong Van Nuis, an associate of Thomas Edison, in 1930.
- Edith Raven (d. 1908), who died unmarried.
- John Howard Raven (1870–1949), a professor at Rutgers College who married Elizabeth Grier Strong, a daughter of the Rev. Selah Woodhull Strong and Eleanor Hendrickson (née Van Deursen) Strong, in 1894.

He was a member of the Montauk Club of Brooklyn, the New York Club, the American Museum of Natural History, and the Metropolitan Museum of Art. He was also a member, and vice president, of the Society for Improving the Condition of the Poor in Brooklyn, a member of the American Geographical Society and a founding member of the Peary Arctic Club.

Raven died at his home in Caldwell, New Jersey, on January 15, 1919.

The Raven Glacier in Greenland was named in his honor.
