= William George Moore (British Army officer) =

British Army officer

Lieutenant-General Sir William George Moore K.C.B. (16 November 1795 – 23 October 1862), served in the Peninsular War and was at the Battle of Waterloo.

He was born in Petersham, the eldest son of Francis Moore (1767 - 1854), Under Secretary at War and a younger brother of General Sir John Moore, and Frances, Countess of Eglinton (daughter of Sir William Twysden, 6th Baronet). Educated at Harrow School he joined the army in 1811 in the 52nd Regiment of light infantry (his uncle, Sir John Moore, had formerly been Colonel), as Ensign; promoted to Lieutenant in 1812 and Captain in 1814. He was present at the sieges of Ciudad Rodrigo, Badajos, and St. Sebastian, and at the battles of Salamanca, Vittoria, Nivelle, and Nive. He served as ADC to Sir John Hope. At the Battle of Bayonne on 14 April 1814 he was severely wounded and taken prisoner while attempting to assist his general when dismounted and wounded.

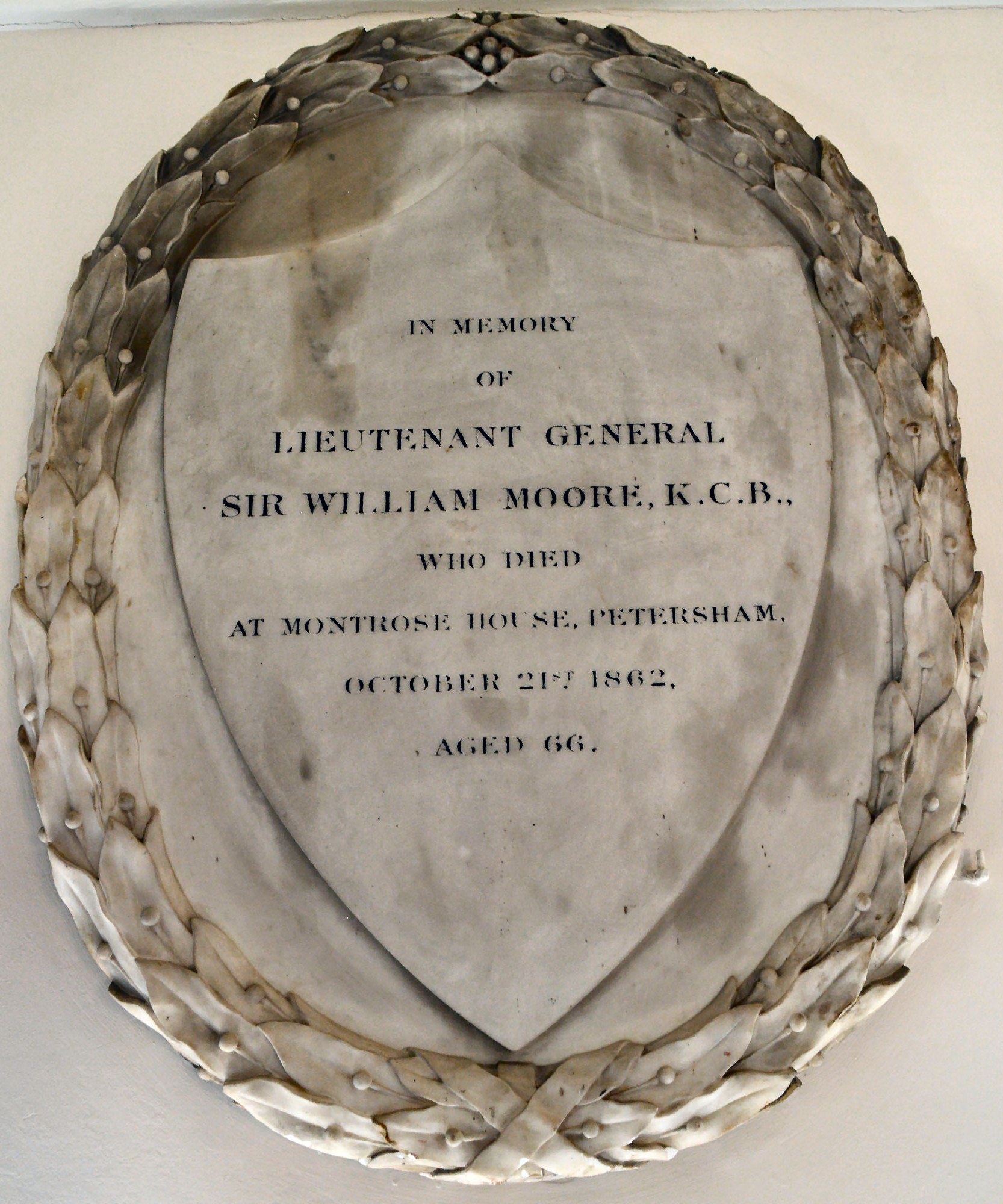
St Peter's Church, Petersham

He was present at the battle of Waterloo, being attached to the Staff of the Quarter-master-General. He obtained the rank of Lieutenant-General on 6 June 1856. He was appointed Colonel-Commandant of the second battalion of the 60th Regiment on the 26 January 1856. On the 4 February 1856 he was nominated a K.C.B. Sir William had received the Waterloo and Peninsular war medals with seven clasps.

He had lived at Charles Street, Berkeley Square and died at Montrose House, Petersham, on 23 October 1862 and is buried in St Peter's Church, Petersham.
