= Willie Moore (Collegians hurler) =

Irish hurler and Gaelic footballer

Personal information
- Native name: Liam Ó Móra (Irish)

Sport
- Sport: Dual player
- Position: Midfield
Club
- Years: Club
- Collegians
Club titles
- Cork titles: 0
Inter-county*
Years	County	Apps (scores)
1915–1919	Cork	5 (0-01)
Inter-county titles
- Munster titles: 2
- All-Irelands: 1
- *Inter County team apps and scores correct as of 17:14, 7 April 2018.

Willie Moore was an Irish hurler and Gaelic footballer. His championship career with the Cork senior teams as a dual player lasted from 1915 until 1919.

Moore made his debut with the Cork senior team during the 1915 championship and went on to become a regular member of the team at various times over the following few years. During this time he won his sole All-Ireland medal. Moore also won two Munster medals as a hurler, while he also won a Munster medal as a Gaelic footballer.

== Honours ==
Cork

- All-Ireland Senior Hurling Championship (1): 1919
- Munster Senior Hurling Championship (2): 1915, 1919
- Munster Senior Football Championship (1): 1916
