= Frederick Garling =

Australian lawyer (1775–1848)

Frederick Garling (17 February 1775 – 2 May 1848) was an English attorney and solicitor, and was one of the first solicitors admitted in Australia and was regarded as the first senior solicitor of the second Supreme Court established in the colony of New South Wales. Garling is recognised as being one of the first Crown Solicitors in Australia.

== Early years ==
He was born in London, the son of Nicholas Garling, a London mantua maker. His paternal grandfather was Nicolaus Garling, a German who migrated to the UK in the 18th century. He was admitted at Westminster, England as an attorney in 1795 in the Court of King's Bench and also as a solicitor in the Court of Chancery. Garling is recorded as being a "certificated" attorney. He married Elizabeth (née Spratt) in London on 14 April 1801. Elizabeth and Garling had five children prior to her death. After Elizabeth's death, he married Sarah Oliver White on 15 September 1835. Sarah died in September 1840 without having children. Peter Garling is one of his descendants.

== Immigration to Australia ==
In February 1814 Garling and another English attorney William Moore were induced to travel to New South Wales by the Colonial Office in the United Kingdom to begin life as a solicitor in that colony. He was offered the sum of £300 to undertake the journey. Both Moore and Garling were first called 'stipendiary Solicitors', and then were later called 'Crown or Government Solicitors'. Although they were referred to as crown solicitors, they were not considered to be professionally retained by the Crown and were independent of it. At the time in New South Wales, the only legally trained persons were those with criminal backgrounds who had been transported to Sydney as convicts. Attorneys such as George Crossley and others while permitted to appear in court as agents (and not lawyers), were not allowed to be admitted due to the English laws which precluded the admission of legal professionals with criminal backgrounds.

Garling left the United Kingdom on 20 October 1814 with his wife Elizabeth and five children. They sailed on the Francis and Eliza. The ship was captured by an American privateer off the island of Madeira. Garling did not arrive in Sydney until 8 August 1815 ostensibly because of this. Historian John Bennett notes that this was unlikely as the cause of the delay, and that in fact, the delay was due to Garling not wishing to leave earlier. The other lawyer Moore arrived seven months earlier.

The biographers for both Garling and Moore note that on 11 May 1815, Moore was the first attorney admitted to the first Supreme Court (being the Supreme Court of Civil Judicature and Garling was the second. It is probable that Garling was the first solicitor admitted to the second Supreme Court which was opened by the first Chief Justice of New South Wales Francis Forbes in May 1824. Forbes formally re-admitted all existing practitioners in the colony. While Garling appears first on the roll, it is claimed that the roll dates from no earlier than 1828. Whatever the merits of the argument, both Moore and Garling can be jointly considered as the first solicitors of New South Wales being appointed at the same time by the Colonial Office prior to their embarkation to Sydney.

== Acting deputy judge advocate ==
The post of Deputy Judge Advocate became vacant after the death of Ellis Bent on 10 November 1815. Governor Macquarie offered Garling the office of Deputy Judge Advocate on an acting basis from 12 December 1815. Garling held this office until the arrival of John Wylde on 5 October 1816. Garling was progressive in that he apparently allowed emancipist solicitors to practise in the courts over which he presided. Macquaire also appointed Garling a justice of the peace. This was an important appointment in the colony, as at the time, a justice of the peace was in effect a local authority governing planning, liquor trading and employment regulation. Additionally, one of the functions of the Deputy Judge Advocate as a justice of the peace was to sit as a court of petty sessions hearing less serious criminal charges.

== Post Supreme Court era ==
Garling and Moore's appointments as "Crown Solicitors" were abolished in 1828. The office was revived in 1829 but neither Garling nor Moore were reappointed. Until 1832 Garling received an allowance for being the Crown Solicitor notwithstanding that his appointment was no longer valid.

Garling was appointed as the Clerk of the Peace for the County of Cumberland. Today, this comprises the whole of the land area into which modern Sydney now has transformed. However, at the time, the county only comprised various townships including Sydney, Parramatta and Windsor. The role of the clerk of the peace is as the registrar of the Court of Quarter Sessions. Apparently Garling was also empowered to file informations in the name of the attorney-general, although it is not clear whether this involved actually prosecuting criminals. In 1830 he was appointed as a crown prosecutor and held this role until 1837. He continued as clerk of the peace until 1839 when he could no longer perform both role as crown prosecutor and clerk of the peace.

Garling was recommended for the post of attorney-general in Van Diemen's Land, now the State of Tasmania in Australia.

Garling died on 2 May 1848 aged 73 years. He was buried in Devonshire Street cemetery in Sydney.

== Practice ==
Garling's biographer describes him as "generous and public-spirited" and a member of many benevolent institutions in New South Wales. Garling appears to have done well as a lawyer in Sydney. Commissioner John Thomas Bigge was commissioned to report on the state of the New South Wales colony to the Colonial Office. In his report on the legal affairs of the colony, Bigge reported that Garling and Moore had been 'very fully remunerated' for the expense of moving to the colony. Author Forbes observes that Garling and Moore were both unremarkable "men of their day". This has to borne in mind with the background of New South Wales at the time. The colony was still considered a backward outpost of the British Empire consisting largely of convicts and ex-convicts. The legal work of the colony largely comprised defamation and debt recovery claims. Forbes notes that some commentators have suggested that Garling and More were "not particularly good attornies [sic]". Forbes also notes that the first chief justice, Francis Forbes, observed that if Moore and Garling had remained in England as attorneys, they "would have been fortunate to be allowed to sit at the same dining table in an hotel as the circuit barristers". This is a reference to the fact that at that time, most junior barristers earned their living in unfashionable circuits in country areas of England.

== Support for fusion of the legal profession ==
The colony of New South Wales did not have a split legal profession like that in England. Legal practitioners were admitted as both advocates and attorneys. After the second Supreme Court started business, barristers moved for the court to formally split the profession into barristers and into solicitors. Garling, along with other practitioners, opposed the splitting of the bar in this manner when it was first mooted in 1824 by newly arrived barristers in the colony. Chief Justice Francis Forbes upheld the fusion of the bar and the legal profession. While Garling opposed the notion, author Forbes notes that Garling knew his place. Garling was quoted in the Sydney Gazette on 16 September 1824 as observing that his instinct was to defer to gentlemen with the "higher duties of barrister".

== See also ==
- Jean Garling
- Frederick Garling Jr.

== Sources ==
- Forbes, J R S (1979). The Divided Legal Profession in Australia. Sydney: Law Book Company Ltd. ISBN 0-455-19865-9.
- "Practising the Law". State Library of New South Wales. Archived from the original on 4 September 2007.
- Wentworth, William Charles (1819). "Statistical, Historical, and Political Description of NSW". London: State Library of New South Wales.
