= William Moore (banker) =

William Henry Moore II (1914 – 6 May 2009) was an American banker.

== Biography ==
Moore was born in Convent, New Jersey to Paul Moore Sr. and was named after his paternal grandfather, William Henry Moore. He attended St. Paul's School, where he served later as Chairman of the Board of Trustees. He graduated from Yale College in 1937. Moore served in the U.S. Navy in World War II. He earned a Bronze Star during the enlistment.

He assumed the presidency of Bankers Trust in 1950, and managed several mergers to transform Bankers Trust into a diversified wholesale and retail banking enterprise from a provider of specialized services to client banks and wealthy individuals. In 1965 he became chairman of the board of Bankers Trust when his father retired from the post, and served in that capacity for 17 years.

Moore sat on the Board of Directors of Republic Aviation, M.A. Hanna Company, Nabisco, American Can, IBM, Lockheed, Royal Globe Insurance, and the Lackawana Railroad. He was the older brother of The Rt. Rev. Paul Moore Jr., an American Episcopal Churchman and political figure.
