= Frederick Garling Jr. =

Customs official and marine artist (1806–1873)

Frederick Garling
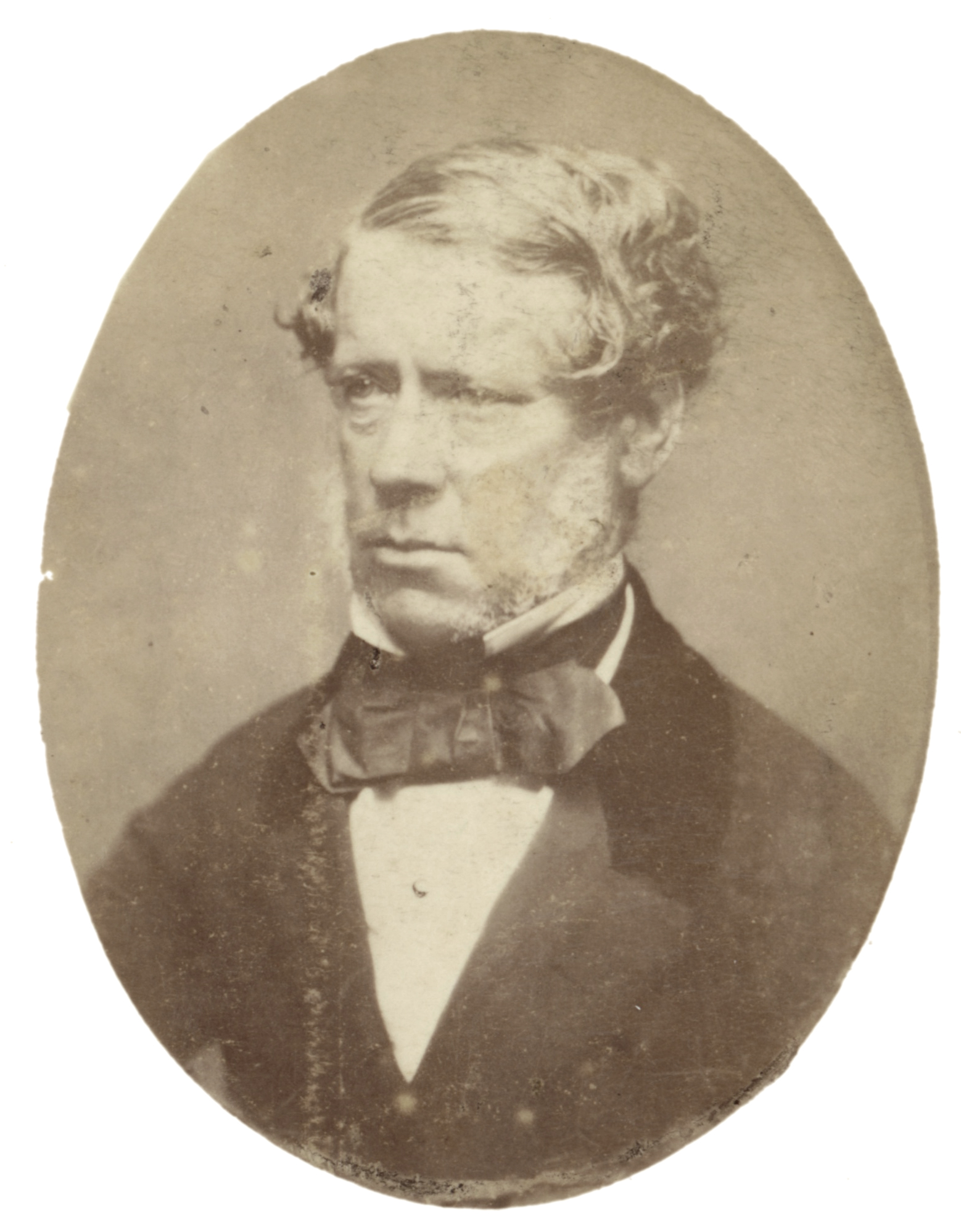
- Frederick Garling Jnr, c. 1865
- Born: 23 February 1806; London, England
- Died: 16 November 1873 (aged 67); Sydney, Australia
- Occupation: Customs officer
- Years active: 1829-1873
- Known for: Artist
- Notable work: King St, Sydney (1843)

Frederick Garling Jr. (23 February 1806 – 16 November 1873) was a British-born Australian customs official and artist.

== Life ==
Garling was born in London on 23 February 1806, one of five children of solicitor Frederick Garling senior (1775-1848) and his wife Elizabeth. The family departed London for Sydney, New South Wales, as free passengers aboard the convict transport ship Francis and Eliza on 20 October 1814. Off the island of Madeira the vessel was captured and plundered by the American privateer Warrior and this delayed the arrival of the Francis and Eliza at Port Jackson till 8 August 1815. Garling senior was one of the first solicitors to come to Australia.

In 1827 Garling took part in James Stirling's exploration of the Swan River, as the expeditions official artist. Among other things he painted View from Mount Eliza.

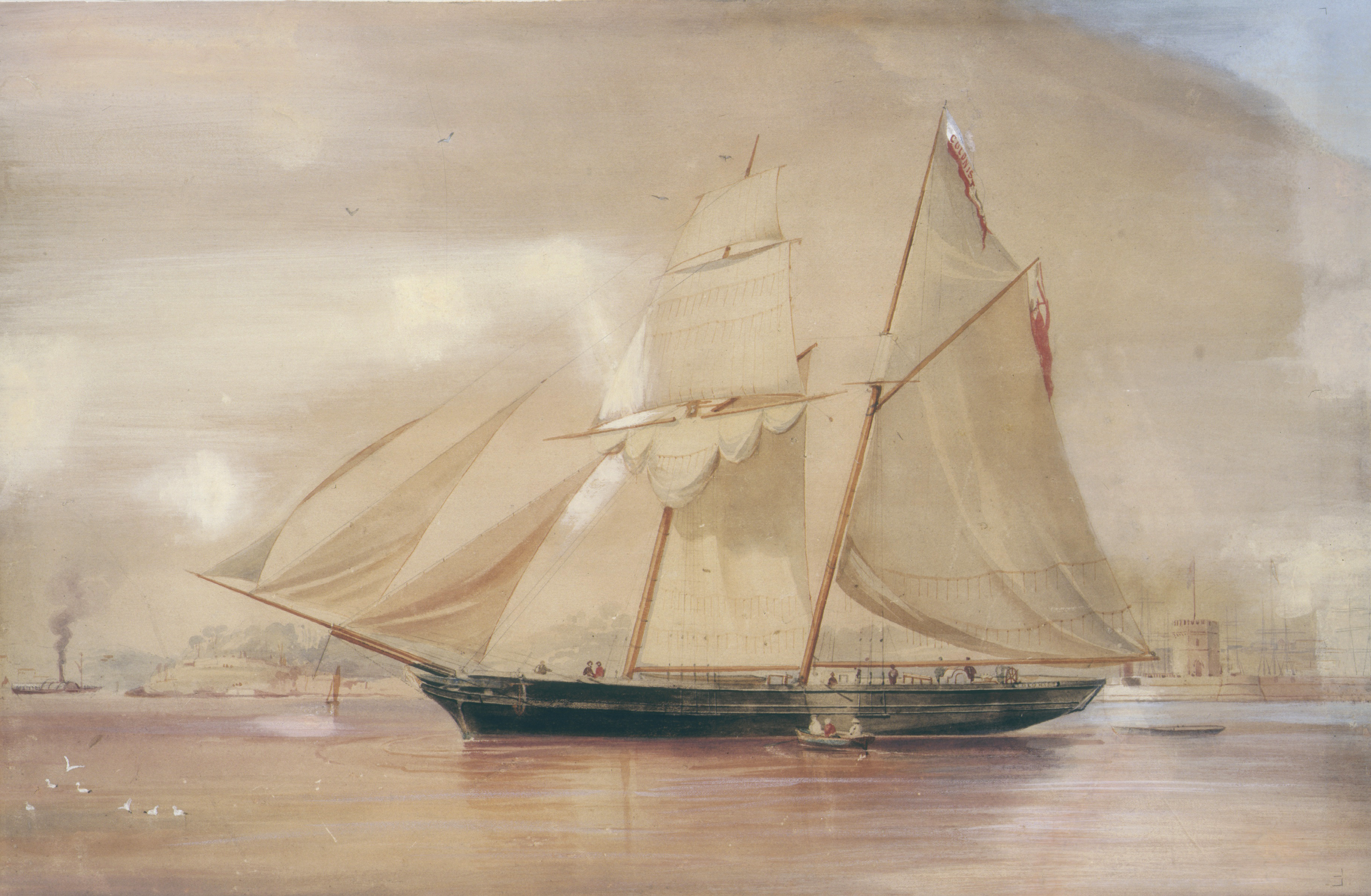
The schooner "Colonist" near Fort Macquarie.

Garling Jnr was appointed Landing Waiter, Searcher and Gauger in the Customs Department at Port Jackson in 1829. He was promoted to the position of acting Landing Surveyor in 1847. He was made permanent in the post the following year. He gave evidence on the operation of the Customs Department to government inquiries in 1856, 1857 and again in 1859.

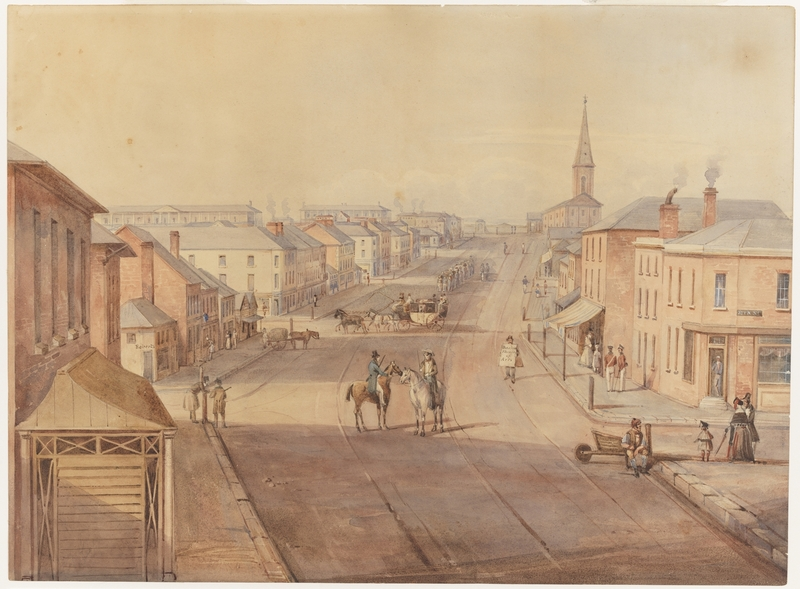
King St, Sydney, by Frederick Garling (c1843)

He was an accomplished self-taught amateur artist, specialising in maritime subjects. Some of his paintings are in the State Library of New South Wales, the Art Gallery of New South Wales, Dixon and Mitchell Galleries, Sydney. An exhibition of his paintings was held at the State Library of New South Wales in 2003.

Garling married Elizabeth Ward in Sydney in 1829 and they had 11 children. His eldest son, Frederick Augustus Garling (1833-1910) was an explorer and settler in Queensland.

Garling retired from the Customs Department in May 1859. He died at his home, at 199 Dowling St, in Sydney on 16 November 1873. He was 68 years of age.
