= Honor Moore =

American poet

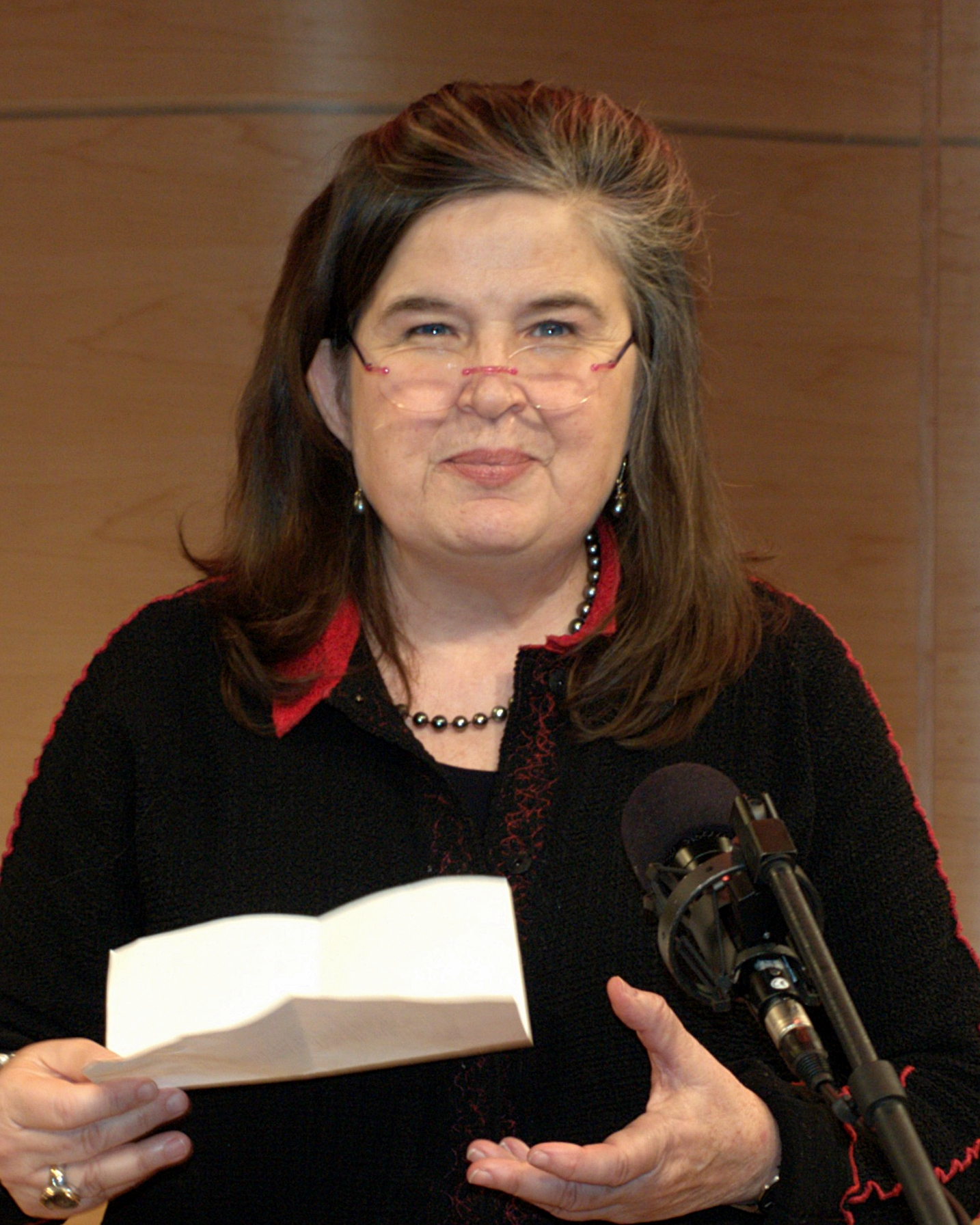
- Born: October 28, 1945 (age 80); New York City, New York, U.S.
- Occupations: Writer, poet, memoirist
- Parents: Paul Moore Jr.; Jenny Moore
- Writing career
- Genres: poetry, memoir
- Notable work: The Bishop's Daughter

Honor Moore (born October 28, 1945) is an American writer of poetry, creative nonfiction and plays. She currently teaches at The New School in the MFA program for creative nonfiction, where she is a part-time associate teaching professor.

The Bishop's Daughter, a memoir of her relationship with her father, Bishop Paul Moore, was named an Editor's Choice by The New York Times, a Favorite Book of 2008 by the Los Angeles Times, and chosen by the National Book Critics Circle as part of their "Good Reads" recommended reading list as well as a finalist for the 2008 National Book Critics Circle Award for Autobiography and Lambda Literary Award for Bisexual Literature.

== Biography ==
Honor Moore was born in 1945 to Jenny Moore and of Bishop Paul Moore. She attended the David Geffen School of Drama at Yale University between 1967 and 1979.

== Career ==
Moore has been poet-in-residence at Wesleyan University and the University of Richmond, visiting professor at the Columbia School of the Arts, and was the Visiting Distinguished Writer in the Nonfiction Writing Program at the University of Iowa.

She is the author of three collections of poems: Red Shoes, Darling, and Memoir; two works of nonfiction, The White Blackbird and The Bishop's Daughter; and the play Mourning Pictures, which was produced on Broadway and published in The New Women’s Theatre: Ten Plays by Contemporary American Women, which she edited.

Moore has received awards in poetry and playwriting from the National Endowment for the Arts, The New York State Council for the Arts and the Connecticut Commission for the Arts and in 2004 was awarded a Guggenheim Fellowship.

In 2012, Moore served as the prestigious Bedell Distinguished Visiting Professor at the University of Iowa's Nonfiction Writing Program.

She is the editor of Amy Lowell: Selected Poems for the Library of America and co-editor of The Stray Dog Cabaret, A Book of Russian Poems, translated by Paul Schmidt. She teaches in the graduate writing programs at The New School and Columbia University School of the Arts. From 2005 to 2007, she was an off-Broadway theatre critic for The New York Times. She is on the editorial board of the literary magazine The Common, based at Amherst College, and published work in the debut issue.

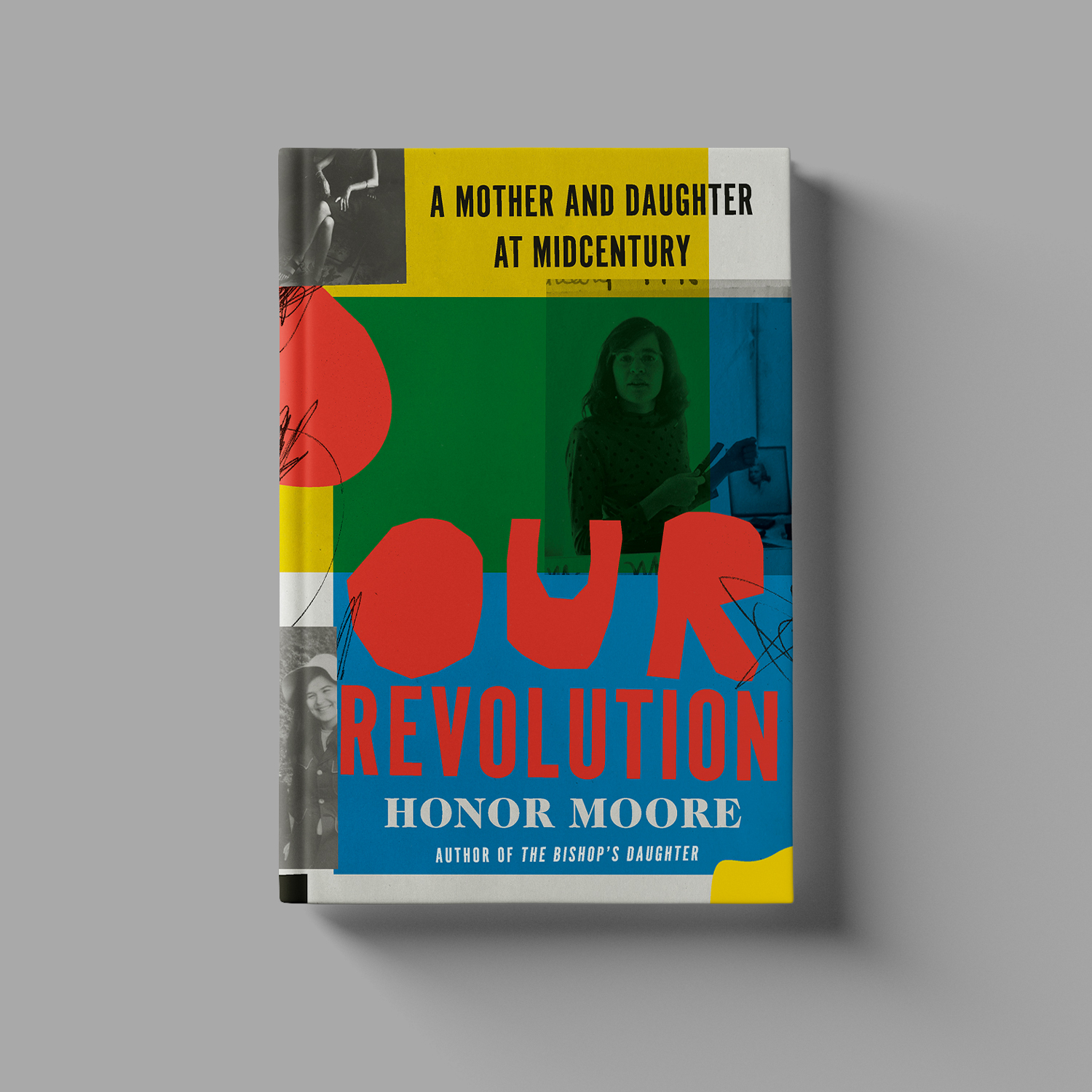
Our Revolution by Honor Moore

The Bishop's Daughter, a memoir of her relationship with her father, Bishop Paul Moore, was named an Editor's Choice by The New York Times, a Favorite Book of 2008 by the Los Angeles Times, and chosen by the National Book Critics Circle as part of their "Good Reads" recommended reading list as well as a finalist for the 2008 National Book Critics Circle Award for Autobiography and Lambda Literary Award for Bisexual Literature. In April 2009, the Library of America published Poems from the Women's Movement, an anthology edited by Honor Moore. A re-issue of The White Blackbird has been published, alongside the paperback release of The Bishop's Daughter.

Her most recent book, Our Revolution: A Mother and Daughter at Midcentury, was released March 2020.

== Bibliography ==
- Our Revolution: A Mother and Daughter at Midcentury (2019)
- The Bishop's Daughter: A Memoir (2008)
- Red Shoes - Poems (2005)
- Darling (2001)
- The White Blackbird: A Life of the Painter Margarett Sargent by Her Granddaughter (1996)
- Memoir (1988)
