= William H. H. Moore =

American insurance executive (1824–1910)

William Henry Helme Moore (February 13, 1824 – January 4, 1910) was an American lawyer and insurance executive who served as president of the Atlantic Mutual Insurance Company.

== Early life ==
Moore was born in Greenport on Long Island on February 13, 1824. He was the third son of Col. Jeremiah Moore (1779–1837) and Julia (née Brush) Moore (1782–1873) and was a descendant of Thomas Moore, one of the earliest English settlers in New York, who was born about 1615.

After preparing for college at Miller Place Academy, he attended Union College in Schenectady, New York, from where he graduated in 1844. After Union, he moved to New York City where he entered the law firm of Cutting & Moore (the firm of his elder brother, Charles B. Moore and Francis B. Cutting), and was admitted to the bar in 1847.

== Career ==
After practicing law, Moore joined the Atlantic Mutual Insurance Company as third officer, and remained affiliated with the company until his death in 1910. He became first vice president in 1886 and president from 1895 until April 7, 1897. Upon his retirement from the presidency, he was succeeded by Anton A. Raven.

Moore later served as first president of the Union College alumni association in addition to serving as a trustee of the College. In 1886 he received the degree of Doctor of Laws. He also served as vice president of the Phi Beta Kappa of New York and of the New York Geographical Society in addition to being president of the Haven's Relief Fund, manager of the Burke Foundation, and president of the Life Saving Benevolent Association.

== Personal life ==
Moore was married to Adelaide Louisa Lewis (1844–1922), a daughter of Isaac Lewis and Cornelia Malvina (née Donaldson) Lewis. Together, they lived on West 72nd Street in New York and maintained a country home "at the ancestral seat of the family in Greenport, Long Island," and were the parents of:

- Arthur Lewis Moore, who married Sarah Frelinghuysen Chambers, a daughter of the Rev. Talbot Wilson Chambers and Louisa Mercer (née Frelinghuysen) Chambers (daughter of John Frederick Frelinghuysen), in 1892.
- Julia Louise Moore (1863–1934), who married LeRoy Cholwell Fairchild.
- William Clifford Moore (1867–1939), a lawyer who died unmarried.
- Adelaide Irving Moore (1871–1963), who married broker Elias Hicks Herrick in 1892.

He was a member of the Union League Club, and was a senior elder of the Brick Presbyterian Church in New York.

Moore died on January 4, 1910, at his residence in New York City. At his death, he was "the last of six brothers and sisters whose average age exceeded eighty years."
