= Will H. Moore =

American political scientist (1962–2017)

- Born: 1962
- Died: April 18, 2017 (aged 54–55)
- Scientific career
- Workplaces: Florida State University
- Website: https://whmoore.net/

Will H. Moore (1962 – April 18, 2017) was an American political scientist and professor of political science at Arizona State University. Previously, he was the Alumni Distinguished Professor of Political Science at Florida State University, and he had been on the faculties of the University of Colorado Boulder and University of California–Riverside.

== Death ==
According to Inside Higher Ed, Moore died by suicide, shortly after posting a suicide note on his blog. It said he was physically healthy and successful in his career but never outgrew his childhood autistic "outsider" identity. Already, as a teenager, he thought about suicide.

After his death, the Peace Science Society established the Will H. Moore III Prize, given to a paper published in its journals (the Journal of Conflict Resolution and Conflict Management and Peace Science) that "most effectively addresses issues directly related to the integrity and respect accorded to individual political rights and freedoms".
