= Stonington Cemetery =

United States historic place in Connecticut

- U.S. National Register of Historic Places
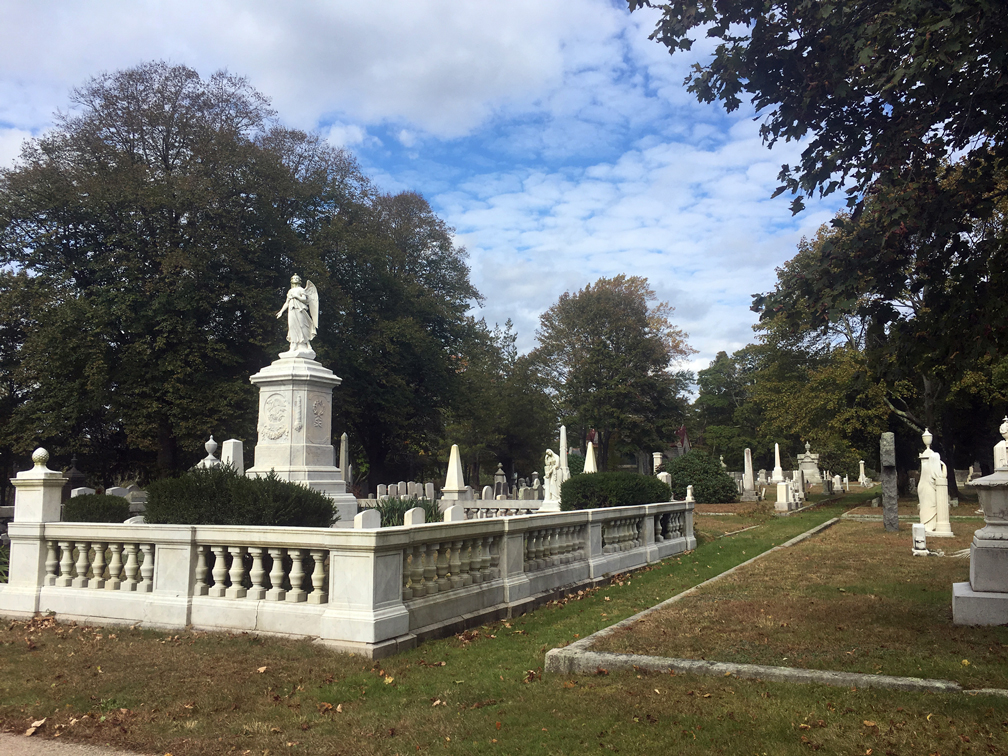

- Location within Connecticut Location within the United States
- Location: Southeast Corner of North Main Street & Route 1, Stonington, Connecticut
- Coordinates: 41°21′02″N 71°54′11″W
- Area: 18.8 acres (7.6 ha)
- Built: c. 1754
- NRHP reference No.: 100002321
- Added to NRHP: April 19, 2018

Stonington Cemetery is a historic cemetery at North Main Street and Route 1 in Stonington, Connecticut. Established as a family cemetery about 1754, it was the first formally incorporated cemetery in New London County, with the incorporation of its association occurring in 1849. Its layout is reflective of changing trends in cemetery organization, from colonial practices to those of the 20th century. It was listed on the National Register of Historic Places in 2018.

== Description and history ==
Stonington Cemetery occupies a roughly rectangular parcel of 18.8 acres (7.6 ha) north of the village of Stonington, at the southeast corner of Main Street and Route 1. It is ringed by a combination of stone walls and fencing, each of varying ages, with the main gate facing Main Street. It is divided into generally rectangular sections, with roadways, some paved and some gravel, defining their perimeters and providing circulation. The cemetery has undergone three major expansions, all in the 19th century; the oldest sections of the cemetery are in its western third.

The cemetery was begun at least as early as 1754, the date on its oldest legible grave marker. It was at the time the family cemetery of the Chesebrough family, descendants of one of Stonington's colonial founders. The Chesebroughs sold their land to the Phelps family, excepting one acre for the burying ground, in 1787; the cemetery was sold to the Phelpses in 1792, and became locally known as the Phelps Burying Ground. The Phelpses allowed others to use the cemetery, and its use as a public cemetery was formalized with the incorporation of the Stonington Cemetery Corporation in 1849. At that time it underwent its first enlargement, with further increases occurring in 1864 and 1888. Each section was laid out according to practices that were fashionable at the time.

Some of the notable people buried in Stonington Cemetery include writer Stephen Vincent Benét, poets James Merrill and J.D. McClatchy, artist Pati Hill, civil engineer George Washington Whistler, explorer Nathaniel Palmer, and diplomat Coert Du Bois.

The cemetery Association is a non-profit 301 (c)13 organization administered by a Board of Directors.

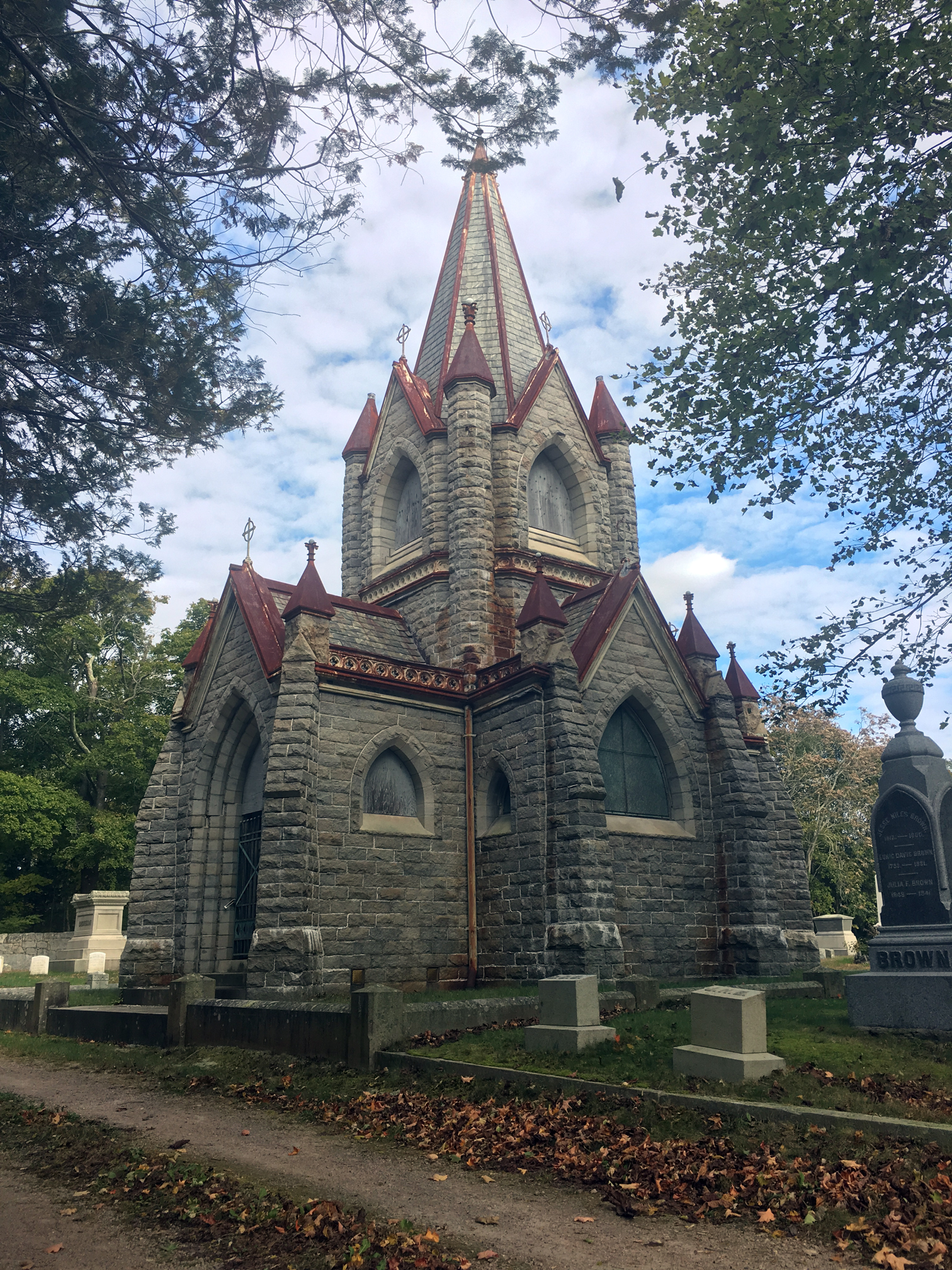
Billings Mausoleum

== See also ==
- National Register of Historic Places listings in New London County, Connecticut
