= Billy Moore (musician, born 1931) =

Guyanan musician and composer (1931–2002)

- Born: William George Moore; April 23, 1931; Georgetown, Guyana
- Died: November 6, 2002 (aged 71)
- Spouse: Catharina Von Unge Moore ( Married in 1966) Partner: Lucia Maria Eloi
- Children: 2
- Musical career
- Genres: Blues
- Occupations: Musician, civil rights and human rights activist
- Instruments: Guitar; Vocals; Drums
- Years active: 1951–2002

William George Moore (April 23, 1931 – November 6, 2002) was a musician and composer from Georgetown, Guyana. Moore had been one of the lead vocalists in the male group The Four Lords. He died in destitution in 2002 at the Georgetown Public Hospital. It is said of him that he was an icon.

== Career ==
Guyana's musical tradition and popular Culture of Guyana performers include Billy (William) Moore and had been one of the lead vocalists in the male group The Four Lords. Their most popular song was the Guyanese Christmas classic "Happy Holiday". "Happy Holiday" was recorded before the time of record track recording technology. The harmonies were captured live.

=== Solo ===
Moore released the single "Love Is Everywhere" with the group Four Lords And Caribbean All Stars, on the label Melodisc Records in April 1979.

=== Awards ===
Moore was honored with the Wordsworth McAndrew Award in 2003 for his contributions to the Guyana's cultural life.
