= William Henry Moore (financier) =

American judge and financier

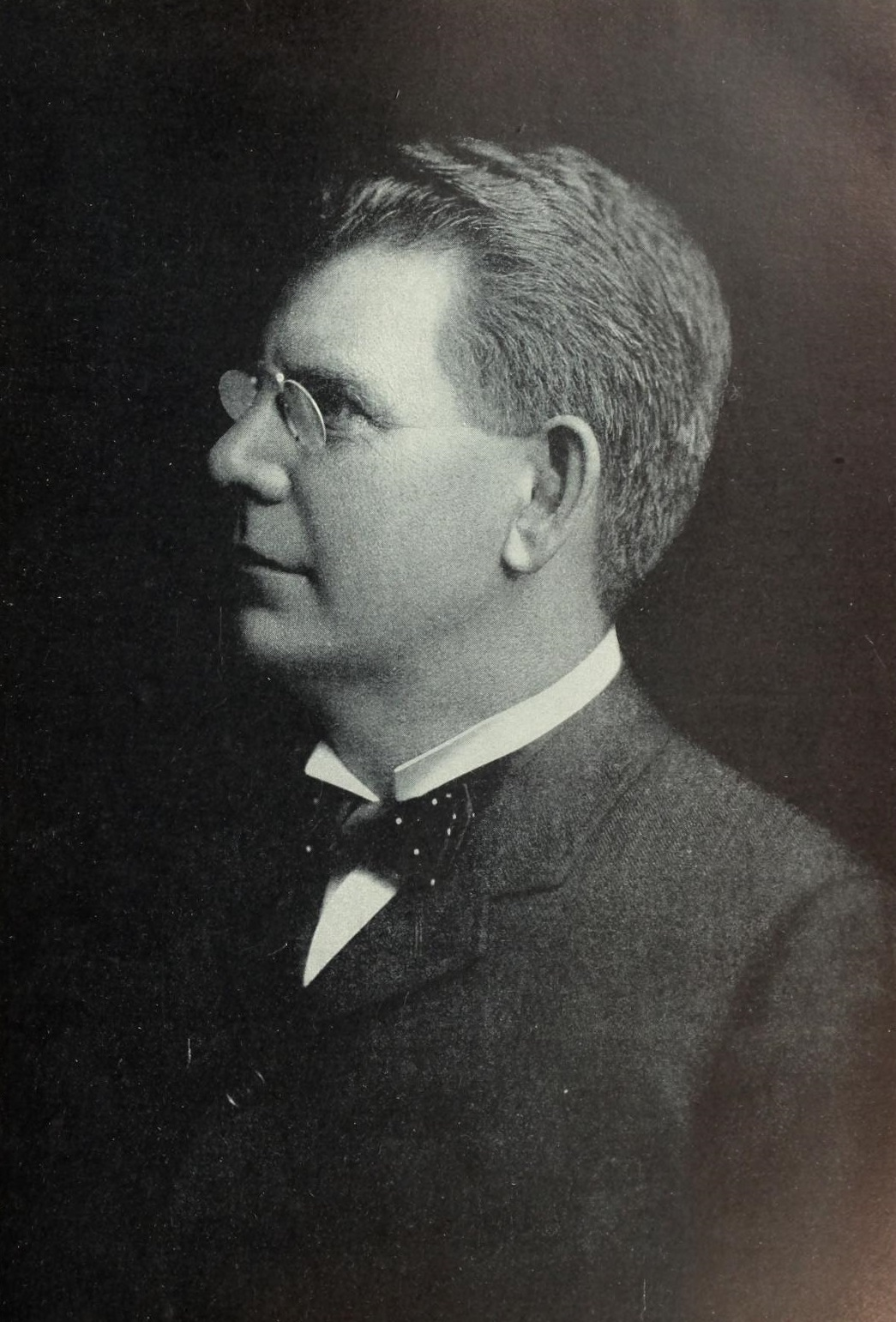
- Moore circa 1905
- Born: October 20, 1848
- Died: January 11, 1923 (aged 74)
- Children: Edward S. Moore, Paul Moore Sr.

William Henry ("Judge") Moore (October 28, 1848 – January 11, 1923) was an American attorney and financier. He organized and promoted or sat as a director for several steel companies that were merged with among others the Carnegie Steel Company to create United States Steel. He and his brother James Hobart Moore helped create the Diamond Match Company, National Biscuit Company, First National Bank, the Delaware, Lackawanna and Western Railroad, the American Can Company, the Lehigh Valley Railroad, the Chicago, Rock Island and Pacific Railroad, the Continental Fire Insurance Company, the Western Union Telegraph Company, the American Cotton Oil Company, and Bankers Trust. Moore was an avid and expert horseman.

== Biography ==
He was born on October 20, 1848. Moore's father, Nathaniel Ford Moore, was a prominent banker and merchant in Utica, New York. His mother, Rachel Arvilla Beckwith, was a daughter of George Beckwith, also a banker, a mid-18th century graduate of Yale College, and a member of the original Yale Corporation.

After a few years at Amherst College, Moore sought adventure in the American West, where he became known to Sitting Bull. Moore returned to the American Midwest on Sitting Bull's advice. Moore then joined the law firm of Edward Alonzo Small, his future father-in-law, and invited his brother James Hobart to join him in Chicago. After Small's death, Hobart partnered with his brother and married Ada Small. Ada was the sister of his sister-in-law, Lora Josephine Small.

Moore has been described as the prototype of the 1980s leveraged buyout artist. He mocked Andrew Carnegie for knowing how to make steel and nothing about "making securities, preferred and common stocks and bonds" during the initial attempt to take over Carnegie Steel Company. After losing $1.1 million on that 90-day option, a subsequent attempt was successful with the assistance of J.P. Morgan. U.S. Steel, Big Steel, was born.

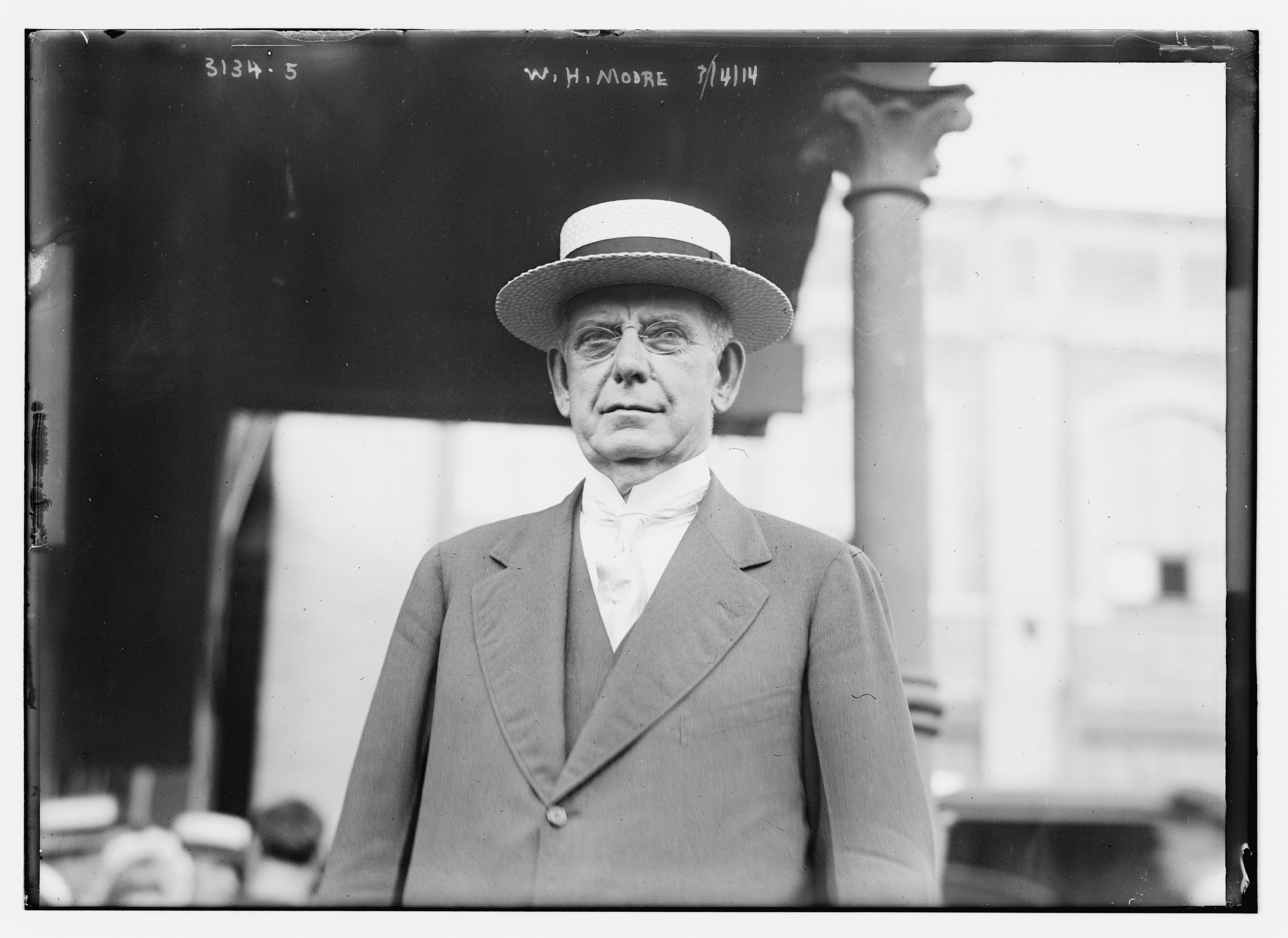
Moore in 1914

The Moores controlled several makers of primary or finished steel products. National Steel Company was among the three primary steel makers (of rails, beams, and unfinished steel) in the United States, controlling about 30% of the current capacity. In addition to National Steel, the Moores controlled the American Tin Plate Company, American Steel Hoop Company, and American Sheet Steel Metal. The above four corporations were among the ten merged to form United States Steel. The other six were Carnegie Steel Company, American Bridge Company, American Wire & Steel Company, Federal Steel Company, Lake Superior Consolidated Iron Mines, and National Tube Company.

Moore acquired the Pearson & Sons Bakery, Josiah Bent Bakery, and six other bakeries to form the New York Biscuit Company in 1889. The New York Biscuit Company merged with a group of bakeries controlled by Adolphus Greene in 1898. The company created by the mergers was the National Biscuit Company., later named simply Nabisco.

Moore was a founding board member of Bankers Trust.

Moore was the father of Edward S. Moore and corporate director Paul Moore Sr., founder of Republic Aviation, and grandfather to Rt. Rev. Paul Moore Jr., Bankers Trust chairman William Moore, and great-grandfather to poet/author Honor Moore, United States Senator Malcolm Wallop and Jean Herbert, Countess of Carnarvon.

He died on January 11, 1923. His home in Manhattan, the William H. Moore House, was added to the National Register of Historic Places on March 16, 1972.
