= William Henry Moore (Australian solicitor) =

English-Australian solicitor (c.1788–1854)

William Henry Moore (c. 1788 - 1854) was an English-Australian solicitor. He was the first free (non-convict) solicitor in the colony of New South Wales and was acting Attorney-General of New South Wales from October 1826 to July 1827 and again from January 1831 to June 1831, the latter stint coinciding with his role as Crown Solicitor from 1829 to 1834.

Moore was born in England, son of a London solicitor, and was admitted as a solicitor himself in 1810. He was selected in 1814 (along with Frederick Garling) as one of two civilian solicitors to be sent to New South Wales to address problems with ex-convict lawyers previously engaged by the colony, and arrived in Sydney on 27 January 1815. He worked for the colonial government in various capacities for much of the period between 1815 and 1834, including two stints as acting Attorney-General. He had a difficult relationship with multiple colonial Governors and was criticised for his professional conduct on a number of occasions. Moore also developed a successful private practice, in part due to the colonial government's refusal to admit ex-convict lawyers to practice.

Moore was a director of the Commercial Banking Company of Sydney from 1836 to 1842 and chairman of the Union Assurance Company from 1832, and bought and sold landholdings in and around Sydney. He was declared insolvent in 1843, was reportedly discharged from bankruptcy in 1845, and died in Sydney in 1854.
